

54001–54100 

|-bgcolor=#fefefe
| 54001 ||  || — || April 4, 2000 || Socorro || LINEAR || V || align=right | 1.5 km || 
|-id=002 bgcolor=#fefefe
| 54002 ||  || — || April 4, 2000 || Socorro || LINEAR || — || align=right | 2.9 km || 
|-id=003 bgcolor=#E9E9E9
| 54003 ||  || — || April 4, 2000 || Socorro || LINEAR || — || align=right | 8.0 km || 
|-id=004 bgcolor=#fefefe
| 54004 ||  || — || April 4, 2000 || Socorro || LINEAR || KLI || align=right | 4.1 km || 
|-id=005 bgcolor=#E9E9E9
| 54005 ||  || — || April 5, 2000 || Socorro || LINEAR || — || align=right | 5.3 km || 
|-id=006 bgcolor=#E9E9E9
| 54006 ||  || — || April 5, 2000 || Socorro || LINEAR || — || align=right | 3.6 km || 
|-id=007 bgcolor=#d6d6d6
| 54007 ||  || — || April 5, 2000 || Socorro || LINEAR || — || align=right | 6.9 km || 
|-id=008 bgcolor=#E9E9E9
| 54008 ||  || — || April 5, 2000 || Socorro || LINEAR || EUN || align=right | 3.3 km || 
|-id=009 bgcolor=#fefefe
| 54009 ||  || — || April 6, 2000 || Socorro || LINEAR || FLO || align=right | 2.0 km || 
|-id=010 bgcolor=#fefefe
| 54010 ||  || — || April 6, 2000 || Socorro || LINEAR || — || align=right | 5.4 km || 
|-id=011 bgcolor=#fefefe
| 54011 ||  || — || April 6, 2000 || Socorro || LINEAR || V || align=right | 1.7 km || 
|-id=012 bgcolor=#E9E9E9
| 54012 ||  || — || April 6, 2000 || Socorro || LINEAR || EUN || align=right | 5.0 km || 
|-id=013 bgcolor=#FA8072
| 54013 ||  || — || April 6, 2000 || Socorro || LINEAR || — || align=right | 1.6 km || 
|-id=014 bgcolor=#fefefe
| 54014 ||  || — || April 7, 2000 || Socorro || LINEAR || FLO || align=right | 2.0 km || 
|-id=015 bgcolor=#fefefe
| 54015 ||  || — || April 7, 2000 || Socorro || LINEAR || FLO || align=right | 1.5 km || 
|-id=016 bgcolor=#fefefe
| 54016 ||  || — || April 7, 2000 || Socorro || LINEAR || FLO || align=right | 2.6 km || 
|-id=017 bgcolor=#fefefe
| 54017 ||  || — || April 7, 2000 || Socorro || LINEAR || — || align=right | 1.8 km || 
|-id=018 bgcolor=#fefefe
| 54018 ||  || — || April 7, 2000 || Socorro || LINEAR || FLO || align=right | 1.3 km || 
|-id=019 bgcolor=#fefefe
| 54019 ||  || — || April 7, 2000 || Socorro || LINEAR || V || align=right | 1.5 km || 
|-id=020 bgcolor=#fefefe
| 54020 ||  || — || April 7, 2000 || Socorro || LINEAR || FLO || align=right | 1.5 km || 
|-id=021 bgcolor=#E9E9E9
| 54021 ||  || — || April 7, 2000 || Socorro || LINEAR || — || align=right | 6.3 km || 
|-id=022 bgcolor=#fefefe
| 54022 ||  || — || April 7, 2000 || Socorro || LINEAR || NYS || align=right | 2.6 km || 
|-id=023 bgcolor=#fefefe
| 54023 ||  || — || April 7, 2000 || Socorro || LINEAR || — || align=right | 2.3 km || 
|-id=024 bgcolor=#E9E9E9
| 54024 ||  || — || April 7, 2000 || Socorro || LINEAR || — || align=right | 3.4 km || 
|-id=025 bgcolor=#E9E9E9
| 54025 ||  || — || April 7, 2000 || Socorro || LINEAR || — || align=right | 3.4 km || 
|-id=026 bgcolor=#E9E9E9
| 54026 ||  || — || April 7, 2000 || Socorro || LINEAR || — || align=right | 6.3 km || 
|-id=027 bgcolor=#fefefe
| 54027 ||  || — || April 7, 2000 || Socorro || LINEAR || — || align=right | 4.7 km || 
|-id=028 bgcolor=#E9E9E9
| 54028 ||  || — || April 7, 2000 || Socorro || LINEAR || — || align=right | 2.4 km || 
|-id=029 bgcolor=#E9E9E9
| 54029 ||  || — || April 7, 2000 || Socorro || LINEAR || — || align=right | 1.8 km || 
|-id=030 bgcolor=#fefefe
| 54030 ||  || — || April 7, 2000 || Socorro || LINEAR || — || align=right | 2.1 km || 
|-id=031 bgcolor=#fefefe
| 54031 ||  || — || April 7, 2000 || Socorro || LINEAR || — || align=right | 1.6 km || 
|-id=032 bgcolor=#fefefe
| 54032 ||  || — || April 7, 2000 || Socorro || LINEAR || — || align=right | 2.3 km || 
|-id=033 bgcolor=#fefefe
| 54033 ||  || — || April 7, 2000 || Socorro || LINEAR || NYS || align=right | 1.6 km || 
|-id=034 bgcolor=#fefefe
| 54034 ||  || — || April 7, 2000 || Socorro || LINEAR || — || align=right | 1.6 km || 
|-id=035 bgcolor=#E9E9E9
| 54035 ||  || — || April 7, 2000 || Socorro || LINEAR || — || align=right | 2.7 km || 
|-id=036 bgcolor=#fefefe
| 54036 ||  || — || April 7, 2000 || Socorro || LINEAR || V || align=right | 2.4 km || 
|-id=037 bgcolor=#fefefe
| 54037 ||  || — || April 2, 2000 || Anderson Mesa || LONEOS || NYS || align=right | 5.6 km || 
|-id=038 bgcolor=#d6d6d6
| 54038 ||  || — || April 2, 2000 || Anderson Mesa || LONEOS || — || align=right | 8.0 km || 
|-id=039 bgcolor=#E9E9E9
| 54039 ||  || — || April 2, 2000 || Anderson Mesa || LONEOS || — || align=right | 3.6 km || 
|-id=040 bgcolor=#fefefe
| 54040 ||  || — || April 5, 2000 || Socorro || LINEAR || NYS || align=right | 1.7 km || 
|-id=041 bgcolor=#fefefe
| 54041 ||  || — || April 7, 2000 || Socorro || LINEAR || V || align=right | 2.7 km || 
|-id=042 bgcolor=#E9E9E9
| 54042 ||  || — || April 7, 2000 || Socorro || LINEAR || — || align=right | 4.1 km || 
|-id=043 bgcolor=#fefefe
| 54043 ||  || — || April 7, 2000 || Socorro || LINEAR || — || align=right | 1.7 km || 
|-id=044 bgcolor=#E9E9E9
| 54044 ||  || — || April 7, 2000 || Socorro || LINEAR || EUN || align=right | 3.9 km || 
|-id=045 bgcolor=#fefefe
| 54045 ||  || — || April 8, 2000 || Socorro || LINEAR || NYS || align=right | 4.0 km || 
|-id=046 bgcolor=#E9E9E9
| 54046 ||  || — || April 7, 2000 || Socorro || LINEAR || — || align=right | 8.1 km || 
|-id=047 bgcolor=#E9E9E9
| 54047 ||  || — || April 7, 2000 || Socorro || LINEAR || — || align=right | 8.3 km || 
|-id=048 bgcolor=#fefefe
| 54048 ||  || — || April 7, 2000 || Socorro || LINEAR || — || align=right | 5.6 km || 
|-id=049 bgcolor=#E9E9E9
| 54049 ||  || — || April 7, 2000 || Socorro || LINEAR || — || align=right | 6.6 km || 
|-id=050 bgcolor=#d6d6d6
| 54050 ||  || — || April 7, 2000 || Socorro || LINEAR || — || align=right | 5.2 km || 
|-id=051 bgcolor=#E9E9E9
| 54051 ||  || — || April 7, 2000 || Socorro || LINEAR || — || align=right | 5.2 km || 
|-id=052 bgcolor=#E9E9E9
| 54052 ||  || — || April 7, 2000 || Socorro || LINEAR || JUN || align=right | 9.1 km || 
|-id=053 bgcolor=#d6d6d6
| 54053 ||  || — || April 7, 2000 || Socorro || LINEAR || — || align=right | 11 km || 
|-id=054 bgcolor=#E9E9E9
| 54054 ||  || — || April 8, 2000 || Socorro || LINEAR || — || align=right | 3.7 km || 
|-id=055 bgcolor=#E9E9E9
| 54055 ||  || — || April 7, 2000 || Socorro || LINEAR || — || align=right | 3.9 km || 
|-id=056 bgcolor=#d6d6d6
| 54056 ||  || — || April 7, 2000 || Socorro || LINEAR || — || align=right | 12 km || 
|-id=057 bgcolor=#fefefe
| 54057 ||  || — || April 7, 2000 || Socorro || LINEAR || — || align=right | 2.7 km || 
|-id=058 bgcolor=#d6d6d6
| 54058 ||  || — || April 7, 2000 || Socorro || LINEAR || — || align=right | 4.6 km || 
|-id=059 bgcolor=#E9E9E9
| 54059 ||  || — || April 8, 2000 || Socorro || LINEAR || — || align=right | 3.5 km || 
|-id=060 bgcolor=#fefefe
| 54060 ||  || — || April 8, 2000 || Socorro || LINEAR || — || align=right | 1.6 km || 
|-id=061 bgcolor=#fefefe
| 54061 ||  || — || April 8, 2000 || Socorro || LINEAR || FLO || align=right | 1.4 km || 
|-id=062 bgcolor=#fefefe
| 54062 ||  || — || April 10, 2000 || Socorro || LINEAR || — || align=right | 3.4 km || 
|-id=063 bgcolor=#d6d6d6
| 54063 ||  || — || April 12, 2000 || Socorro || LINEAR || — || align=right | 6.5 km || 
|-id=064 bgcolor=#fefefe
| 54064 ||  || — || April 4, 2000 || Anderson Mesa || LONEOS || — || align=right | 2.0 km || 
|-id=065 bgcolor=#d6d6d6
| 54065 ||  || — || April 4, 2000 || Anderson Mesa || LONEOS || 629 || align=right | 4.3 km || 
|-id=066 bgcolor=#fefefe
| 54066 ||  || — || April 4, 2000 || Anderson Mesa || LONEOS || FLO || align=right | 1.4 km || 
|-id=067 bgcolor=#fefefe
| 54067 ||  || — || April 4, 2000 || Anderson Mesa || LONEOS || — || align=right | 2.0 km || 
|-id=068 bgcolor=#E9E9E9
| 54068 ||  || — || April 7, 2000 || Anderson Mesa || LONEOS || EUN || align=right | 3.9 km || 
|-id=069 bgcolor=#E9E9E9
| 54069 ||  || — || April 7, 2000 || Anderson Mesa || LONEOS || — || align=right | 5.7 km || 
|-id=070 bgcolor=#fefefe
| 54070 ||  || — || April 7, 2000 || Anderson Mesa || LONEOS || FLO || align=right | 1.9 km || 
|-id=071 bgcolor=#FFC2E0
| 54071 ||  || — || April 10, 2000 || Socorro || LINEAR || AMO +1km || align=right | 1.3 km || 
|-id=072 bgcolor=#fefefe
| 54072 ||  || — || April 5, 2000 || Socorro || LINEAR || — || align=right | 2.1 km || 
|-id=073 bgcolor=#fefefe
| 54073 ||  || — || April 5, 2000 || Socorro || LINEAR || NYS || align=right | 4.9 km || 
|-id=074 bgcolor=#fefefe
| 54074 ||  || — || April 5, 2000 || Socorro || LINEAR || NYS || align=right | 1.1 km || 
|-id=075 bgcolor=#fefefe
| 54075 ||  || — || April 6, 2000 || Anderson Mesa || LONEOS || — || align=right | 5.4 km || 
|-id=076 bgcolor=#fefefe
| 54076 ||  || — || April 6, 2000 || Anderson Mesa || LONEOS || V || align=right | 1.9 km || 
|-id=077 bgcolor=#fefefe
| 54077 ||  || — || April 6, 2000 || Socorro || LINEAR || V || align=right | 2.3 km || 
|-id=078 bgcolor=#E9E9E9
| 54078 ||  || — || April 6, 2000 || Socorro || LINEAR || — || align=right | 2.4 km || 
|-id=079 bgcolor=#fefefe
| 54079 ||  || — || April 7, 2000 || Anderson Mesa || LONEOS || FLO || align=right | 1.7 km || 
|-id=080 bgcolor=#fefefe
| 54080 ||  || — || April 7, 2000 || Socorro || LINEAR || — || align=right | 2.8 km || 
|-id=081 bgcolor=#E9E9E9
| 54081 ||  || — || April 7, 2000 || Anderson Mesa || LONEOS || — || align=right | 7.8 km || 
|-id=082 bgcolor=#fefefe
| 54082 ||  || — || April 8, 2000 || Socorro || LINEAR || — || align=right | 2.3 km || 
|-id=083 bgcolor=#fefefe
| 54083 ||  || — || April 8, 2000 || Socorro || LINEAR || — || align=right | 3.0 km || 
|-id=084 bgcolor=#fefefe
| 54084 ||  || — || April 9, 2000 || Anderson Mesa || LONEOS || V || align=right | 2.6 km || 
|-id=085 bgcolor=#E9E9E9
| 54085 ||  || — || April 12, 2000 || Socorro || LINEAR || — || align=right | 5.3 km || 
|-id=086 bgcolor=#fefefe
| 54086 ||  || — || April 5, 2000 || Socorro || LINEAR || V || align=right | 1.4 km || 
|-id=087 bgcolor=#fefefe
| 54087 ||  || — || April 2, 2000 || Anderson Mesa || LONEOS || V || align=right | 2.4 km || 
|-id=088 bgcolor=#fefefe
| 54088 ||  || — || April 5, 2000 || Anderson Mesa || LONEOS || FLO || align=right | 1.2 km || 
|-id=089 bgcolor=#E9E9E9
| 54089 ||  || — || April 2, 2000 || Kitt Peak || Spacewatch || — || align=right | 4.5 km || 
|-id=090 bgcolor=#fefefe
| 54090 ||  || — || April 2, 2000 || Anderson Mesa || LONEOS || FLO || align=right | 1.7 km || 
|-id=091 bgcolor=#E9E9E9
| 54091 ||  || — || April 4, 2000 || Socorro || LINEAR || — || align=right | 4.1 km || 
|-id=092 bgcolor=#fefefe
| 54092 ||  || — || April 2, 2000 || Socorro || LINEAR || PHO || align=right | 2.3 km || 
|-id=093 bgcolor=#fefefe
| 54093 ||  || — || April 2, 2000 || Kitt Peak || Spacewatch || — || align=right | 2.1 km || 
|-id=094 bgcolor=#d6d6d6
| 54094 ||  || — || April 5, 2000 || Xinglong || SCAP || ALA || align=right | 10 km || 
|-id=095 bgcolor=#fefefe
| 54095 ||  || — || April 25, 2000 || Kitt Peak || Spacewatch || V || align=right | 3.3 km || 
|-id=096 bgcolor=#fefefe
| 54096 ||  || — || April 25, 2000 || Višnjan Observatory || K. Korlević || — || align=right | 2.9 km || 
|-id=097 bgcolor=#E9E9E9
| 54097 ||  || — || April 26, 2000 || Višnjan Observatory || K. Korlević || — || align=right | 2.7 km || 
|-id=098 bgcolor=#E9E9E9
| 54098 ||  || — || April 29, 2000 || Socorro || LINEAR || — || align=right | 7.4 km || 
|-id=099 bgcolor=#fefefe
| 54099 ||  || — || April 26, 2000 || Kitt Peak || Spacewatch || — || align=right | 1.7 km || 
|-id=100 bgcolor=#E9E9E9
| 54100 ||  || — || April 28, 2000 || Prescott || P. G. Comba || — || align=right | 3.5 km || 
|}

54101–54200 

|-bgcolor=#fefefe
| 54101 ||  || — || April 28, 2000 || Prescott || P. G. Comba || — || align=right | 4.1 km || 
|-id=102 bgcolor=#d6d6d6
| 54102 ||  || — || April 28, 2000 || Prescott || P. G. Comba || THM || align=right | 6.8 km || 
|-id=103 bgcolor=#fefefe
| 54103 ||  || — || April 24, 2000 || Kitt Peak || Spacewatch || NYS || align=right | 2.3 km || 
|-id=104 bgcolor=#E9E9E9
| 54104 ||  || — || April 27, 2000 || Socorro || LINEAR || — || align=right | 2.3 km || 
|-id=105 bgcolor=#fefefe
| 54105 ||  || — || April 27, 2000 || Socorro || LINEAR || FLO || align=right | 2.0 km || 
|-id=106 bgcolor=#fefefe
| 54106 ||  || — || April 27, 2000 || Socorro || LINEAR || V || align=right | 2.5 km || 
|-id=107 bgcolor=#E9E9E9
| 54107 ||  || — || April 27, 2000 || Socorro || LINEAR || — || align=right | 5.1 km || 
|-id=108 bgcolor=#d6d6d6
| 54108 ||  || — || April 27, 2000 || Socorro || LINEAR || ALA || align=right | 9.3 km || 
|-id=109 bgcolor=#d6d6d6
| 54109 ||  || — || April 27, 2000 || Socorro || LINEAR || THM || align=right | 9.6 km || 
|-id=110 bgcolor=#d6d6d6
| 54110 ||  || — || April 27, 2000 || Socorro || LINEAR || — || align=right | 5.1 km || 
|-id=111 bgcolor=#fefefe
| 54111 ||  || — || April 30, 2000 || Farpoint || Farpoint Obs. || — || align=right | 3.7 km || 
|-id=112 bgcolor=#d6d6d6
| 54112 ||  || — || April 28, 2000 || Socorro || LINEAR || EOS || align=right | 4.2 km || 
|-id=113 bgcolor=#fefefe
| 54113 ||  || — || April 28, 2000 || Socorro || LINEAR || — || align=right | 2.1 km || 
|-id=114 bgcolor=#E9E9E9
| 54114 ||  || — || April 28, 2000 || Socorro || LINEAR || — || align=right | 7.2 km || 
|-id=115 bgcolor=#fefefe
| 54115 ||  || — || April 29, 2000 || Socorro || LINEAR || V || align=right | 1.5 km || 
|-id=116 bgcolor=#E9E9E9
| 54116 ||  || — || April 24, 2000 || Kitt Peak || Spacewatch || — || align=right | 4.8 km || 
|-id=117 bgcolor=#E9E9E9
| 54117 ||  || — || April 27, 2000 || Kitt Peak || Spacewatch || — || align=right | 7.6 km || 
|-id=118 bgcolor=#E9E9E9
| 54118 ||  || — || April 27, 2000 || Socorro || LINEAR || — || align=right | 2.8 km || 
|-id=119 bgcolor=#fefefe
| 54119 ||  || — || April 28, 2000 || Socorro || LINEAR || V || align=right | 1.5 km || 
|-id=120 bgcolor=#fefefe
| 54120 ||  || — || April 24, 2000 || Anderson Mesa || LONEOS || — || align=right | 1.2 km || 
|-id=121 bgcolor=#E9E9E9
| 54121 ||  || — || April 24, 2000 || Anderson Mesa || LONEOS || — || align=right | 2.9 km || 
|-id=122 bgcolor=#fefefe
| 54122 ||  || — || April 30, 2000 || Socorro || LINEAR || — || align=right | 1.5 km || 
|-id=123 bgcolor=#d6d6d6
| 54123 ||  || — || April 27, 2000 || Socorro || LINEAR || — || align=right | 9.2 km || 
|-id=124 bgcolor=#d6d6d6
| 54124 ||  || — || April 27, 2000 || Socorro || LINEAR || HYG || align=right | 6.3 km || 
|-id=125 bgcolor=#fefefe
| 54125 ||  || — || April 27, 2000 || Socorro || LINEAR || — || align=right | 1.7 km || 
|-id=126 bgcolor=#fefefe
| 54126 ||  || — || April 28, 2000 || Socorro || LINEAR || FLO || align=right | 1.7 km || 
|-id=127 bgcolor=#E9E9E9
| 54127 ||  || — || April 28, 2000 || Socorro || LINEAR || — || align=right | 4.2 km || 
|-id=128 bgcolor=#E9E9E9
| 54128 ||  || — || April 28, 2000 || Socorro || LINEAR || — || align=right | 3.5 km || 
|-id=129 bgcolor=#E9E9E9
| 54129 ||  || — || April 28, 2000 || Socorro || LINEAR || — || align=right | 4.8 km || 
|-id=130 bgcolor=#E9E9E9
| 54130 ||  || — || April 29, 2000 || Socorro || LINEAR || — || align=right | 4.9 km || 
|-id=131 bgcolor=#fefefe
| 54131 ||  || — || April 29, 2000 || Socorro || LINEAR || — || align=right | 1.9 km || 
|-id=132 bgcolor=#E9E9E9
| 54132 ||  || — || April 29, 2000 || Socorro || LINEAR || — || align=right | 2.4 km || 
|-id=133 bgcolor=#d6d6d6
| 54133 ||  || — || April 29, 2000 || Socorro || LINEAR || ALA || align=right | 10 km || 
|-id=134 bgcolor=#fefefe
| 54134 ||  || — || April 25, 2000 || Anderson Mesa || LONEOS || — || align=right | 2.9 km || 
|-id=135 bgcolor=#fefefe
| 54135 ||  || — || April 24, 2000 || Anderson Mesa || LONEOS || V || align=right | 1.4 km || 
|-id=136 bgcolor=#fefefe
| 54136 ||  || — || April 27, 2000 || Socorro || LINEAR || — || align=right | 1.6 km || 
|-id=137 bgcolor=#E9E9E9
| 54137 ||  || — || April 28, 2000 || Socorro || LINEAR || — || align=right | 3.7 km || 
|-id=138 bgcolor=#E9E9E9
| 54138 ||  || — || April 28, 2000 || Socorro || LINEAR || — || align=right | 3.6 km || 
|-id=139 bgcolor=#E9E9E9
| 54139 ||  || — || April 28, 2000 || Socorro || LINEAR || MAR || align=right | 5.5 km || 
|-id=140 bgcolor=#E9E9E9
| 54140 ||  || — || April 28, 2000 || Socorro || LINEAR || MAR || align=right | 4.3 km || 
|-id=141 bgcolor=#E9E9E9
| 54141 ||  || — || April 28, 2000 || Socorro || LINEAR || MAR || align=right | 2.7 km || 
|-id=142 bgcolor=#fefefe
| 54142 ||  || — || April 29, 2000 || Kitt Peak || Spacewatch || V || align=right | 2.2 km || 
|-id=143 bgcolor=#E9E9E9
| 54143 ||  || — || April 29, 2000 || Kitt Peak || Spacewatch || EUN || align=right | 2.9 km || 
|-id=144 bgcolor=#E9E9E9
| 54144 ||  || — || April 30, 2000 || Kitt Peak || Spacewatch || — || align=right | 6.4 km || 
|-id=145 bgcolor=#E9E9E9
| 54145 ||  || — || April 30, 2000 || Kitt Peak || Spacewatch || EUN || align=right | 6.2 km || 
|-id=146 bgcolor=#E9E9E9
| 54146 ||  || — || April 28, 2000 || Socorro || LINEAR || — || align=right | 5.3 km || 
|-id=147 bgcolor=#E9E9E9
| 54147 ||  || — || April 28, 2000 || Socorro || LINEAR || EUN || align=right | 3.2 km || 
|-id=148 bgcolor=#E9E9E9
| 54148 ||  || — || April 28, 2000 || Socorro || LINEAR || — || align=right | 5.2 km || 
|-id=149 bgcolor=#fefefe
| 54149 ||  || — || April 29, 2000 || Socorro || LINEAR || V || align=right | 1.6 km || 
|-id=150 bgcolor=#E9E9E9
| 54150 ||  || — || April 29, 2000 || Socorro || LINEAR || — || align=right | 3.3 km || 
|-id=151 bgcolor=#fefefe
| 54151 ||  || — || April 26, 2000 || Anderson Mesa || LONEOS || V || align=right | 2.1 km || 
|-id=152 bgcolor=#fefefe
| 54152 ||  || — || April 26, 2000 || Anderson Mesa || LONEOS || V || align=right | 2.1 km || 
|-id=153 bgcolor=#fefefe
| 54153 ||  || — || April 29, 2000 || Socorro || LINEAR || V || align=right | 1.4 km || 
|-id=154 bgcolor=#fefefe
| 54154 ||  || — || April 29, 2000 || Socorro || LINEAR || — || align=right | 1.9 km || 
|-id=155 bgcolor=#d6d6d6
| 54155 ||  || — || April 29, 2000 || Socorro || LINEAR || EMA || align=right | 8.4 km || 
|-id=156 bgcolor=#fefefe
| 54156 ||  || — || April 29, 2000 || Socorro || LINEAR || FLO || align=right | 3.9 km || 
|-id=157 bgcolor=#fefefe
| 54157 ||  || — || April 29, 2000 || Socorro || LINEAR || NYS || align=right | 2.3 km || 
|-id=158 bgcolor=#fefefe
| 54158 ||  || — || April 29, 2000 || Socorro || LINEAR || MAS || align=right | 1.4 km || 
|-id=159 bgcolor=#fefefe
| 54159 ||  || — || April 29, 2000 || Socorro || LINEAR || NYS || align=right | 1.8 km || 
|-id=160 bgcolor=#E9E9E9
| 54160 ||  || — || April 29, 2000 || Socorro || LINEAR || HEN || align=right | 2.4 km || 
|-id=161 bgcolor=#fefefe
| 54161 ||  || — || April 29, 2000 || Socorro || LINEAR || — || align=right | 1.8 km || 
|-id=162 bgcolor=#fefefe
| 54162 ||  || — || April 29, 2000 || Socorro || LINEAR || MAS || align=right | 2.3 km || 
|-id=163 bgcolor=#E9E9E9
| 54163 ||  || — || April 29, 2000 || Socorro || LINEAR || — || align=right | 4.4 km || 
|-id=164 bgcolor=#fefefe
| 54164 ||  || — || April 29, 2000 || Socorro || LINEAR || NYS || align=right | 2.5 km || 
|-id=165 bgcolor=#fefefe
| 54165 ||  || — || April 29, 2000 || Socorro || LINEAR || NYS || align=right | 1.7 km || 
|-id=166 bgcolor=#fefefe
| 54166 ||  || — || April 29, 2000 || Socorro || LINEAR || — || align=right | 2.4 km || 
|-id=167 bgcolor=#E9E9E9
| 54167 ||  || — || April 29, 2000 || Socorro || LINEAR || ADE || align=right | 6.6 km || 
|-id=168 bgcolor=#fefefe
| 54168 ||  || — || April 24, 2000 || Anderson Mesa || LONEOS || — || align=right | 2.2 km || 
|-id=169 bgcolor=#fefefe
| 54169 ||  || — || April 24, 2000 || Anderson Mesa || LONEOS || V || align=right | 2.7 km || 
|-id=170 bgcolor=#fefefe
| 54170 ||  || — || April 24, 2000 || Anderson Mesa || LONEOS || NYS || align=right | 1.7 km || 
|-id=171 bgcolor=#fefefe
| 54171 ||  || — || April 24, 2000 || Anderson Mesa || LONEOS || — || align=right | 3.0 km || 
|-id=172 bgcolor=#E9E9E9
| 54172 ||  || — || April 24, 2000 || Kitt Peak || Spacewatch || — || align=right | 4.2 km || 
|-id=173 bgcolor=#fefefe
| 54173 ||  || — || April 25, 2000 || Anderson Mesa || LONEOS || V || align=right | 2.6 km || 
|-id=174 bgcolor=#E9E9E9
| 54174 ||  || — || April 25, 2000 || Anderson Mesa || LONEOS || — || align=right | 6.7 km || 
|-id=175 bgcolor=#fefefe
| 54175 ||  || — || April 25, 2000 || Anderson Mesa || LONEOS || MAS || align=right | 1.8 km || 
|-id=176 bgcolor=#fefefe
| 54176 ||  || — || April 25, 2000 || Anderson Mesa || LONEOS || — || align=right | 1.6 km || 
|-id=177 bgcolor=#d6d6d6
| 54177 ||  || — || April 25, 2000 || Anderson Mesa || LONEOS || KOR || align=right | 3.5 km || 
|-id=178 bgcolor=#fefefe
| 54178 ||  || — || April 25, 2000 || Anderson Mesa || LONEOS || NYS || align=right | 3.9 km || 
|-id=179 bgcolor=#E9E9E9
| 54179 ||  || — || April 25, 2000 || Kitt Peak || Spacewatch || — || align=right | 2.4 km || 
|-id=180 bgcolor=#E9E9E9
| 54180 ||  || — || April 26, 2000 || Anderson Mesa || LONEOS || — || align=right | 4.7 km || 
|-id=181 bgcolor=#E9E9E9
| 54181 ||  || — || April 26, 2000 || Anderson Mesa || LONEOS || — || align=right | 3.6 km || 
|-id=182 bgcolor=#d6d6d6
| 54182 Galsarid ||  ||  || April 26, 2000 || Anderson Mesa || LONEOS || THM || align=right | 6.8 km || 
|-id=183 bgcolor=#E9E9E9
| 54183 ||  || — || April 26, 2000 || Anderson Mesa || LONEOS || — || align=right | 3.7 km || 
|-id=184 bgcolor=#fefefe
| 54184 ||  || — || April 27, 2000 || Kitt Peak || Spacewatch || MAS || align=right | 1.6 km || 
|-id=185 bgcolor=#fefefe
| 54185 ||  || — || April 27, 2000 || Socorro || LINEAR || — || align=right | 1.7 km || 
|-id=186 bgcolor=#E9E9E9
| 54186 ||  || — || April 27, 2000 || Socorro || LINEAR || — || align=right | 4.8 km || 
|-id=187 bgcolor=#d6d6d6
| 54187 ||  || — || April 27, 2000 || Socorro || LINEAR || — || align=right | 6.1 km || 
|-id=188 bgcolor=#E9E9E9
| 54188 ||  || — || April 27, 2000 || Socorro || LINEAR || — || align=right | 2.6 km || 
|-id=189 bgcolor=#d6d6d6
| 54189 ||  || — || April 27, 2000 || Socorro || LINEAR || — || align=right | 6.5 km || 
|-id=190 bgcolor=#fefefe
| 54190 ||  || — || April 27, 2000 || Socorro || LINEAR || — || align=right | 5.7 km || 
|-id=191 bgcolor=#E9E9E9
| 54191 ||  || — || April 27, 2000 || Socorro || LINEAR || — || align=right | 2.8 km || 
|-id=192 bgcolor=#fefefe
| 54192 ||  || — || April 27, 2000 || Socorro || LINEAR || V || align=right | 1.4 km || 
|-id=193 bgcolor=#E9E9E9
| 54193 ||  || — || April 27, 2000 || Socorro || LINEAR || — || align=right | 4.3 km || 
|-id=194 bgcolor=#fefefe
| 54194 ||  || — || April 27, 2000 || Socorro || LINEAR || — || align=right | 1.3 km || 
|-id=195 bgcolor=#fefefe
| 54195 ||  || — || April 28, 2000 || Socorro || LINEAR || V || align=right | 1.5 km || 
|-id=196 bgcolor=#fefefe
| 54196 ||  || — || April 28, 2000 || Socorro || LINEAR || — || align=right | 3.9 km || 
|-id=197 bgcolor=#fefefe
| 54197 ||  || — || April 28, 2000 || Socorro || LINEAR || FLO || align=right | 2.3 km || 
|-id=198 bgcolor=#E9E9E9
| 54198 ||  || — || April 28, 2000 || Socorro || LINEAR || — || align=right | 10 km || 
|-id=199 bgcolor=#fefefe
| 54199 ||  || — || April 28, 2000 || Socorro || LINEAR || — || align=right | 2.8 km || 
|-id=200 bgcolor=#E9E9E9
| 54200 ||  || — || April 28, 2000 || Anderson Mesa || LONEOS || — || align=right | 2.9 km || 
|}

54201–54300 

|-bgcolor=#E9E9E9
| 54201 ||  || — || April 28, 2000 || Anderson Mesa || LONEOS || EUN || align=right | 4.2 km || 
|-id=202 bgcolor=#E9E9E9
| 54202 ||  || — || April 28, 2000 || Anderson Mesa || LONEOS || — || align=right | 3.3 km || 
|-id=203 bgcolor=#E9E9E9
| 54203 ||  || — || April 28, 2000 || Anderson Mesa || LONEOS || — || align=right | 5.8 km || 
|-id=204 bgcolor=#E9E9E9
| 54204 ||  || — || April 28, 2000 || Anderson Mesa || LONEOS || — || align=right | 3.7 km || 
|-id=205 bgcolor=#E9E9E9
| 54205 ||  || — || April 29, 2000 || Socorro || LINEAR || — || align=right | 5.4 km || 
|-id=206 bgcolor=#E9E9E9
| 54206 ||  || — || April 30, 2000 || Anderson Mesa || LONEOS || — || align=right | 11 km || 
|-id=207 bgcolor=#E9E9E9
| 54207 ||  || — || April 30, 2000 || Anderson Mesa || LONEOS || — || align=right | 4.3 km || 
|-id=208 bgcolor=#E9E9E9
| 54208 ||  || — || April 30, 2000 || Anderson Mesa || LONEOS || NEM || align=right | 5.0 km || 
|-id=209 bgcolor=#fefefe
| 54209 ||  || — || April 30, 2000 || Anderson Mesa || LONEOS || FLO || align=right | 2.8 km || 
|-id=210 bgcolor=#d6d6d6
| 54210 ||  || — || April 27, 2000 || Socorro || LINEAR || — || align=right | 7.4 km || 
|-id=211 bgcolor=#E9E9E9
| 54211 ||  || — || April 29, 2000 || Socorro || LINEAR || HEN || align=right | 1.9 km || 
|-id=212 bgcolor=#fefefe
| 54212 ||  || — || April 29, 2000 || Socorro || LINEAR || — || align=right | 1.5 km || 
|-id=213 bgcolor=#d6d6d6
| 54213 ||  || — || April 29, 2000 || Socorro || LINEAR || — || align=right | 4.6 km || 
|-id=214 bgcolor=#E9E9E9
| 54214 ||  || — || April 29, 2000 || Socorro || LINEAR || — || align=right | 4.1 km || 
|-id=215 bgcolor=#fefefe
| 54215 ||  || — || April 28, 2000 || Socorro || LINEAR || V || align=right | 2.2 km || 
|-id=216 bgcolor=#fefefe
| 54216 ||  || — || April 28, 2000 || Socorro || LINEAR || V || align=right | 3.9 km || 
|-id=217 bgcolor=#E9E9E9
| 54217 ||  || — || April 27, 2000 || Kitt Peak || Spacewatch || — || align=right | 5.2 km || 
|-id=218 bgcolor=#d6d6d6
| 54218 ||  || — || April 27, 2000 || Anderson Mesa || LONEOS || — || align=right | 5.6 km || 
|-id=219 bgcolor=#E9E9E9
| 54219 ||  || — || April 25, 2000 || Anderson Mesa || LONEOS || — || align=right | 5.2 km || 
|-id=220 bgcolor=#E9E9E9
| 54220 ||  || — || April 24, 2000 || Anderson Mesa || LONEOS || — || align=right | 6.2 km || 
|-id=221 bgcolor=#fefefe
| 54221 ||  || — || April 24, 2000 || Anderson Mesa || LONEOS || V || align=right | 2.2 km || 
|-id=222 bgcolor=#d6d6d6
| 54222 || 2000 JF || — || May 3, 2000 || Kleť || Kleť Obs. || EOS || align=right | 7.2 km || 
|-id=223 bgcolor=#E9E9E9
| 54223 || 2000 JU || — || May 1, 2000 || Socorro || LINEAR || — || align=right | 3.8 km || 
|-id=224 bgcolor=#E9E9E9
| 54224 ||  || — || May 4, 2000 || Socorro || LINEAR || — || align=right | 5.7 km || 
|-id=225 bgcolor=#E9E9E9
| 54225 ||  || — || May 4, 2000 || Kitt Peak || Spacewatch || — || align=right | 5.0 km || 
|-id=226 bgcolor=#fefefe
| 54226 ||  || — || May 5, 2000 || Socorro || LINEAR || — || align=right | 4.3 km || 
|-id=227 bgcolor=#d6d6d6
| 54227 ||  || — || May 3, 2000 || Socorro || LINEAR || — || align=right | 3.5 km || 
|-id=228 bgcolor=#fefefe
| 54228 ||  || — || May 5, 2000 || Socorro || LINEAR || V || align=right | 2.0 km || 
|-id=229 bgcolor=#E9E9E9
| 54229 ||  || — || May 6, 2000 || Socorro || LINEAR || — || align=right | 3.7 km || 
|-id=230 bgcolor=#fefefe
| 54230 ||  || — || May 6, 2000 || Socorro || LINEAR || NYS || align=right | 1.2 km || 
|-id=231 bgcolor=#fefefe
| 54231 ||  || — || May 6, 2000 || Socorro || LINEAR || NYS || align=right | 1.6 km || 
|-id=232 bgcolor=#d6d6d6
| 54232 ||  || — || May 9, 2000 || Prescott || P. G. Comba || KOR || align=right | 3.0 km || 
|-id=233 bgcolor=#d6d6d6
| 54233 ||  || — || May 5, 2000 || Socorro || LINEAR || EOS || align=right | 4.6 km || 
|-id=234 bgcolor=#fefefe
| 54234 ||  || — || May 6, 2000 || Socorro || LINEAR || H || align=right | 1.5 km || 
|-id=235 bgcolor=#E9E9E9
| 54235 ||  || — || May 5, 2000 || Socorro || LINEAR || — || align=right | 2.6 km || 
|-id=236 bgcolor=#fefefe
| 54236 ||  || — || May 5, 2000 || Socorro || LINEAR || — || align=right | 2.5 km || 
|-id=237 bgcolor=#d6d6d6
| 54237 Hiroshimanabe ||  ||  || May 5, 2000 || Kuma Kogen || A. Nakamura || LIX || align=right | 8.1 km || 
|-id=238 bgcolor=#d6d6d6
| 54238 ||  || — || May 3, 2000 || Socorro || LINEAR || — || align=right | 11 km || 
|-id=239 bgcolor=#fefefe
| 54239 ||  || — || May 3, 2000 || Socorro || LINEAR || PHO || align=right | 2.6 km || 
|-id=240 bgcolor=#d6d6d6
| 54240 ||  || — || May 4, 2000 || Socorro || LINEAR || EUP || align=right | 13 km || 
|-id=241 bgcolor=#fefefe
| 54241 ||  || — || May 6, 2000 || Socorro || LINEAR || FLO || align=right | 2.6 km || 
|-id=242 bgcolor=#fefefe
| 54242 ||  || — || May 6, 2000 || Socorro || LINEAR || — || align=right | 2.0 km || 
|-id=243 bgcolor=#fefefe
| 54243 ||  || — || May 6, 2000 || Socorro || LINEAR || — || align=right | 3.7 km || 
|-id=244 bgcolor=#fefefe
| 54244 ||  || — || May 6, 2000 || Socorro || LINEAR || — || align=right | 2.0 km || 
|-id=245 bgcolor=#E9E9E9
| 54245 ||  || — || May 6, 2000 || Socorro || LINEAR || — || align=right | 3.8 km || 
|-id=246 bgcolor=#fefefe
| 54246 ||  || — || May 6, 2000 || Socorro || LINEAR || — || align=right | 2.2 km || 
|-id=247 bgcolor=#E9E9E9
| 54247 ||  || — || May 7, 2000 || Socorro || LINEAR || — || align=right | 7.0 km || 
|-id=248 bgcolor=#fefefe
| 54248 ||  || — || May 7, 2000 || Socorro || LINEAR || V || align=right | 1.7 km || 
|-id=249 bgcolor=#fefefe
| 54249 ||  || — || May 7, 2000 || Socorro || LINEAR || V || align=right | 1.7 km || 
|-id=250 bgcolor=#fefefe
| 54250 ||  || — || May 7, 2000 || Socorro || LINEAR || V || align=right | 1.9 km || 
|-id=251 bgcolor=#fefefe
| 54251 ||  || — || May 7, 2000 || Socorro || LINEAR || V || align=right | 2.3 km || 
|-id=252 bgcolor=#d6d6d6
| 54252 ||  || — || May 7, 2000 || Socorro || LINEAR || — || align=right | 4.1 km || 
|-id=253 bgcolor=#E9E9E9
| 54253 ||  || — || May 7, 2000 || Socorro || LINEAR || HNA || align=right | 4.7 km || 
|-id=254 bgcolor=#fefefe
| 54254 ||  || — || May 7, 2000 || Socorro || LINEAR || FLO || align=right | 1.7 km || 
|-id=255 bgcolor=#fefefe
| 54255 ||  || — || May 7, 2000 || Socorro || LINEAR || — || align=right | 2.5 km || 
|-id=256 bgcolor=#E9E9E9
| 54256 ||  || — || May 7, 2000 || Socorro || LINEAR || — || align=right | 3.8 km || 
|-id=257 bgcolor=#fefefe
| 54257 ||  || — || May 7, 2000 || Socorro || LINEAR || V || align=right | 2.8 km || 
|-id=258 bgcolor=#E9E9E9
| 54258 ||  || — || May 7, 2000 || Socorro || LINEAR || — || align=right | 3.2 km || 
|-id=259 bgcolor=#E9E9E9
| 54259 ||  || — || May 7, 2000 || Socorro || LINEAR || — || align=right | 2.6 km || 
|-id=260 bgcolor=#fefefe
| 54260 ||  || — || May 7, 2000 || Socorro || LINEAR || — || align=right | 1.7 km || 
|-id=261 bgcolor=#fefefe
| 54261 ||  || — || May 7, 2000 || Socorro || LINEAR || — || align=right | 3.2 km || 
|-id=262 bgcolor=#fefefe
| 54262 ||  || — || May 7, 2000 || Socorro || LINEAR || FLO || align=right | 1.6 km || 
|-id=263 bgcolor=#E9E9E9
| 54263 ||  || — || May 7, 2000 || Socorro || LINEAR || — || align=right | 2.6 km || 
|-id=264 bgcolor=#fefefe
| 54264 ||  || — || May 7, 2000 || Socorro || LINEAR || NYS || align=right | 1.9 km || 
|-id=265 bgcolor=#fefefe
| 54265 ||  || — || May 7, 2000 || Socorro || LINEAR || V || align=right | 2.0 km || 
|-id=266 bgcolor=#fefefe
| 54266 ||  || — || May 7, 2000 || Socorro || LINEAR || — || align=right | 1.7 km || 
|-id=267 bgcolor=#fefefe
| 54267 ||  || — || May 7, 2000 || Socorro || LINEAR || V || align=right | 1.7 km || 
|-id=268 bgcolor=#d6d6d6
| 54268 ||  || — || May 7, 2000 || Socorro || LINEAR || HYG || align=right | 6.1 km || 
|-id=269 bgcolor=#E9E9E9
| 54269 ||  || — || May 7, 2000 || Socorro || LINEAR || — || align=right | 2.3 km || 
|-id=270 bgcolor=#d6d6d6
| 54270 ||  || — || May 7, 2000 || Socorro || LINEAR || — || align=right | 7.7 km || 
|-id=271 bgcolor=#fefefe
| 54271 ||  || — || May 7, 2000 || Socorro || LINEAR || V || align=right | 3.7 km || 
|-id=272 bgcolor=#d6d6d6
| 54272 ||  || — || May 6, 2000 || Socorro || LINEAR || KOR || align=right | 3.2 km || 
|-id=273 bgcolor=#fefefe
| 54273 ||  || — || May 6, 2000 || Socorro || LINEAR || MAS || align=right | 2.0 km || 
|-id=274 bgcolor=#E9E9E9
| 54274 ||  || — || May 7, 2000 || Socorro || LINEAR || — || align=right | 2.0 km || 
|-id=275 bgcolor=#fefefe
| 54275 ||  || — || May 7, 2000 || Socorro || LINEAR || NYS || align=right | 1.6 km || 
|-id=276 bgcolor=#E9E9E9
| 54276 ||  || — || May 7, 2000 || Socorro || LINEAR || — || align=right | 6.9 km || 
|-id=277 bgcolor=#E9E9E9
| 54277 ||  || — || May 7, 2000 || Socorro || LINEAR || — || align=right | 3.2 km || 
|-id=278 bgcolor=#E9E9E9
| 54278 ||  || — || May 9, 2000 || Socorro || LINEAR || — || align=right | 3.0 km || 
|-id=279 bgcolor=#fefefe
| 54279 ||  || — || May 9, 2000 || Socorro || LINEAR || V || align=right | 1.6 km || 
|-id=280 bgcolor=#d6d6d6
| 54280 ||  || — || May 9, 2000 || Socorro || LINEAR || — || align=right | 4.1 km || 
|-id=281 bgcolor=#fefefe
| 54281 ||  || — || May 9, 2000 || Socorro || LINEAR || V || align=right | 2.5 km || 
|-id=282 bgcolor=#fefefe
| 54282 ||  || — || May 9, 2000 || Socorro || LINEAR || — || align=right | 2.2 km || 
|-id=283 bgcolor=#fefefe
| 54283 ||  || — || May 9, 2000 || Socorro || LINEAR || — || align=right | 3.2 km || 
|-id=284 bgcolor=#E9E9E9
| 54284 ||  || — || May 9, 2000 || Socorro || LINEAR || — || align=right | 3.4 km || 
|-id=285 bgcolor=#E9E9E9
| 54285 ||  || — || May 9, 2000 || Socorro || LINEAR || HEN || align=right | 2.7 km || 
|-id=286 bgcolor=#d6d6d6
| 54286 ||  || — || May 9, 2000 || Socorro || LINEAR || LIX || align=right | 9.3 km || 
|-id=287 bgcolor=#E9E9E9
| 54287 ||  || — || May 9, 2000 || Socorro || LINEAR || — || align=right | 3.9 km || 
|-id=288 bgcolor=#E9E9E9
| 54288 Daikikawasaki ||  ||  || May 4, 2000 || Nanyo || T. Okuni || EUN || align=right | 4.2 km || 
|-id=289 bgcolor=#fefefe
| 54289 ||  || — || May 6, 2000 || Socorro || LINEAR || — || align=right | 2.1 km || 
|-id=290 bgcolor=#fefefe
| 54290 ||  || — || May 6, 2000 || Socorro || LINEAR || FLO || align=right | 2.3 km || 
|-id=291 bgcolor=#E9E9E9
| 54291 ||  || — || May 6, 2000 || Socorro || LINEAR || — || align=right | 5.1 km || 
|-id=292 bgcolor=#fefefe
| 54292 ||  || — || May 6, 2000 || Socorro || LINEAR || — || align=right | 2.9 km || 
|-id=293 bgcolor=#d6d6d6
| 54293 ||  || — || May 6, 2000 || Socorro || LINEAR || EOS || align=right | 8.0 km || 
|-id=294 bgcolor=#E9E9E9
| 54294 ||  || — || May 6, 2000 || Socorro || LINEAR || — || align=right | 3.5 km || 
|-id=295 bgcolor=#fefefe
| 54295 ||  || — || May 7, 2000 || Socorro || LINEAR || — || align=right | 3.9 km || 
|-id=296 bgcolor=#fefefe
| 54296 ||  || — || May 7, 2000 || Socorro || LINEAR || — || align=right | 2.4 km || 
|-id=297 bgcolor=#d6d6d6
| 54297 ||  || — || May 7, 2000 || Socorro || LINEAR || — || align=right | 5.8 km || 
|-id=298 bgcolor=#fefefe
| 54298 ||  || — || May 7, 2000 || Socorro || LINEAR || — || align=right | 3.2 km || 
|-id=299 bgcolor=#fefefe
| 54299 ||  || — || May 9, 2000 || Socorro || LINEAR || V || align=right | 2.7 km || 
|-id=300 bgcolor=#fefefe
| 54300 ||  || — || May 10, 2000 || Socorro || LINEAR || NYS || align=right | 1.6 km || 
|}

54301–54400 

|-bgcolor=#E9E9E9
| 54301 ||  || — || May 10, 2000 || Socorro || LINEAR || — || align=right | 3.2 km || 
|-id=302 bgcolor=#E9E9E9
| 54302 ||  || — || May 6, 2000 || Socorro || LINEAR || — || align=right | 2.9 km || 
|-id=303 bgcolor=#E9E9E9
| 54303 ||  || — || May 6, 2000 || Socorro || LINEAR || — || align=right | 6.4 km || 
|-id=304 bgcolor=#E9E9E9
| 54304 ||  || — || May 6, 2000 || Socorro || LINEAR || EUN || align=right | 3.3 km || 
|-id=305 bgcolor=#E9E9E9
| 54305 ||  || — || May 1, 2000 || Anderson Mesa || LONEOS || — || align=right | 5.4 km || 
|-id=306 bgcolor=#E9E9E9
| 54306 ||  || — || May 2, 2000 || Socorro || LINEAR || — || align=right | 12 km || 
|-id=307 bgcolor=#fefefe
| 54307 ||  || — || May 1, 2000 || Anderson Mesa || LONEOS || — || align=right | 2.0 km || 
|-id=308 bgcolor=#E9E9E9
| 54308 ||  || — || May 2, 2000 || Anderson Mesa || LONEOS || GEF || align=right | 3.5 km || 
|-id=309 bgcolor=#fefefe
| 54309 ||  || — || May 2, 2000 || Anderson Mesa || LONEOS || — || align=right | 2.7 km || 
|-id=310 bgcolor=#E9E9E9
| 54310 ||  || — || May 2, 2000 || Anderson Mesa || LONEOS || MAR || align=right | 4.0 km || 
|-id=311 bgcolor=#d6d6d6
| 54311 ||  || — || May 2, 2000 || Anderson Mesa || LONEOS || — || align=right | 8.1 km || 
|-id=312 bgcolor=#E9E9E9
| 54312 ||  || — || May 2, 2000 || Kitt Peak || Spacewatch || — || align=right | 2.6 km || 
|-id=313 bgcolor=#fefefe
| 54313 ||  || — || May 3, 2000 || Socorro || LINEAR || — || align=right | 1.5 km || 
|-id=314 bgcolor=#fefefe
| 54314 ||  || — || May 5, 2000 || Socorro || LINEAR || — || align=right | 1.9 km || 
|-id=315 bgcolor=#fefefe
| 54315 ||  || — || May 5, 2000 || Socorro || LINEAR || FLO || align=right | 2.6 km || 
|-id=316 bgcolor=#E9E9E9
| 54316 ||  || — || May 6, 2000 || Socorro || LINEAR || EUN || align=right | 4.5 km || 
|-id=317 bgcolor=#E9E9E9
| 54317 ||  || — || May 6, 2000 || Socorro || LINEAR || MAR || align=right | 2.9 km || 
|-id=318 bgcolor=#E9E9E9
| 54318 ||  || — || May 6, 2000 || Socorro || LINEAR || VIB || align=right | 5.5 km || 
|-id=319 bgcolor=#E9E9E9
| 54319 ||  || — || May 6, 2000 || Socorro || LINEAR || — || align=right | 3.1 km || 
|-id=320 bgcolor=#d6d6d6
| 54320 ||  || — || May 6, 2000 || Kitt Peak || Spacewatch || — || align=right | 7.0 km || 
|-id=321 bgcolor=#E9E9E9
| 54321 ||  || — || May 15, 2000 || Črni Vrh || Črni Vrh || — || align=right | 3.8 km || 
|-id=322 bgcolor=#E9E9E9
| 54322 ||  || — || May 5, 2000 || Socorro || LINEAR || — || align=right | 3.0 km || 
|-id=323 bgcolor=#E9E9E9
| 54323 ||  || — || May 1, 2000 || Socorro || LINEAR || HNS || align=right | 4.3 km || 
|-id=324 bgcolor=#fefefe
| 54324 ||  || — || May 27, 2000 || Socorro || LINEAR || V || align=right | 1.8 km || 
|-id=325 bgcolor=#d6d6d6
| 54325 ||  || — || May 27, 2000 || Socorro || LINEAR || HYG || align=right | 7.4 km || 
|-id=326 bgcolor=#fefefe
| 54326 ||  || — || May 27, 2000 || Socorro || LINEAR || V || align=right | 3.1 km || 
|-id=327 bgcolor=#E9E9E9
| 54327 ||  || — || May 27, 2000 || Prescott || P. G. Comba || — || align=right | 3.3 km || 
|-id=328 bgcolor=#fefefe
| 54328 ||  || — || May 28, 2000 || Socorro || LINEAR || PHO || align=right | 2.7 km || 
|-id=329 bgcolor=#d6d6d6
| 54329 ||  || — || May 27, 2000 || Socorro || LINEAR || — || align=right | 7.8 km || 
|-id=330 bgcolor=#d6d6d6
| 54330 ||  || — || May 27, 2000 || Socorro || LINEAR || — || align=right | 6.0 km || 
|-id=331 bgcolor=#E9E9E9
| 54331 ||  || — || May 27, 2000 || Socorro || LINEAR || — || align=right | 5.5 km || 
|-id=332 bgcolor=#fefefe
| 54332 ||  || — || May 28, 2000 || Socorro || LINEAR || NYS || align=right | 3.1 km || 
|-id=333 bgcolor=#E9E9E9
| 54333 ||  || — || May 28, 2000 || Socorro || LINEAR || WIT || align=right | 2.4 km || 
|-id=334 bgcolor=#d6d6d6
| 54334 ||  || — || May 28, 2000 || Socorro || LINEAR || NAE || align=right | 7.4 km || 
|-id=335 bgcolor=#E9E9E9
| 54335 ||  || — || May 28, 2000 || Socorro || LINEAR || — || align=right | 3.2 km || 
|-id=336 bgcolor=#E9E9E9
| 54336 ||  || — || May 28, 2000 || Socorro || LINEAR || EUN || align=right | 3.5 km || 
|-id=337 bgcolor=#fefefe
| 54337 ||  || — || May 28, 2000 || Socorro || LINEAR || — || align=right | 4.5 km || 
|-id=338 bgcolor=#E9E9E9
| 54338 ||  || — || May 28, 2000 || Socorro || LINEAR || — || align=right | 2.9 km || 
|-id=339 bgcolor=#E9E9E9
| 54339 ||  || — || May 28, 2000 || Socorro || LINEAR || — || align=right | 4.7 km || 
|-id=340 bgcolor=#E9E9E9
| 54340 ||  || — || May 28, 2000 || Socorro || LINEAR || HEN || align=right | 3.3 km || 
|-id=341 bgcolor=#E9E9E9
| 54341 ||  || — || May 28, 2000 || Socorro || LINEAR || — || align=right | 2.7 km || 
|-id=342 bgcolor=#d6d6d6
| 54342 ||  || — || May 28, 2000 || Socorro || LINEAR || EOS || align=right | 7.5 km || 
|-id=343 bgcolor=#E9E9E9
| 54343 ||  || — || May 28, 2000 || Socorro || LINEAR || — || align=right | 6.7 km || 
|-id=344 bgcolor=#E9E9E9
| 54344 ||  || — || May 28, 2000 || Socorro || LINEAR || — || align=right | 4.1 km || 
|-id=345 bgcolor=#E9E9E9
| 54345 ||  || — || May 28, 2000 || Socorro || LINEAR || — || align=right | 3.8 km || 
|-id=346 bgcolor=#fefefe
| 54346 ||  || — || May 28, 2000 || Socorro || LINEAR || — || align=right | 2.3 km || 
|-id=347 bgcolor=#fefefe
| 54347 ||  || — || May 28, 2000 || Socorro || LINEAR || V || align=right | 2.0 km || 
|-id=348 bgcolor=#d6d6d6
| 54348 ||  || — || May 28, 2000 || Socorro || LINEAR || — || align=right | 9.2 km || 
|-id=349 bgcolor=#d6d6d6
| 54349 ||  || — || May 28, 2000 || Socorro || LINEAR || THM || align=right | 10 km || 
|-id=350 bgcolor=#fefefe
| 54350 ||  || — || May 28, 2000 || Socorro || LINEAR || EUT || align=right | 1.8 km || 
|-id=351 bgcolor=#fefefe
| 54351 ||  || — || May 28, 2000 || Socorro || LINEAR || — || align=right | 3.7 km || 
|-id=352 bgcolor=#fefefe
| 54352 ||  || — || May 28, 2000 || Socorro || LINEAR || — || align=right | 2.4 km || 
|-id=353 bgcolor=#fefefe
| 54353 ||  || — || May 29, 2000 || Socorro || LINEAR || V || align=right | 1.8 km || 
|-id=354 bgcolor=#d6d6d6
| 54354 ||  || — || May 28, 2000 || Socorro || LINEAR || VER || align=right | 7.9 km || 
|-id=355 bgcolor=#fefefe
| 54355 ||  || — || May 28, 2000 || Socorro || LINEAR || FLO || align=right | 4.1 km || 
|-id=356 bgcolor=#fefefe
| 54356 ||  || — || May 28, 2000 || Socorro || LINEAR || — || align=right | 3.5 km || 
|-id=357 bgcolor=#fefefe
| 54357 ||  || — || May 28, 2000 || Socorro || LINEAR || NYS || align=right | 2.3 km || 
|-id=358 bgcolor=#d6d6d6
| 54358 ||  || — || May 27, 2000 || Socorro || LINEAR || — || align=right | 5.0 km || 
|-id=359 bgcolor=#E9E9E9
| 54359 ||  || — || May 27, 2000 || Socorro || LINEAR || — || align=right | 4.8 km || 
|-id=360 bgcolor=#E9E9E9
| 54360 ||  || — || May 27, 2000 || Socorro || LINEAR || — || align=right | 4.4 km || 
|-id=361 bgcolor=#E9E9E9
| 54361 ||  || — || May 24, 2000 || Kitt Peak || Spacewatch || — || align=right | 2.0 km || 
|-id=362 bgcolor=#E9E9E9
| 54362 Restitutum ||  ||  || May 27, 2000 || Anza || M. Collins, M. White || EUN || align=right | 3.1 km || 
|-id=363 bgcolor=#fefefe
| 54363 ||  || — || May 24, 2000 || Kitt Peak || Spacewatch || — || align=right | 1.6 km || 
|-id=364 bgcolor=#E9E9E9
| 54364 ||  || — || May 28, 2000 || Socorro || LINEAR || MAR || align=right | 3.5 km || 
|-id=365 bgcolor=#E9E9E9
| 54365 ||  || — || May 28, 2000 || Socorro || LINEAR || MAR || align=right | 3.1 km || 
|-id=366 bgcolor=#d6d6d6
| 54366 ||  || — || May 26, 2000 || Kitt Peak || Spacewatch || — || align=right | 4.6 km || 
|-id=367 bgcolor=#fefefe
| 54367 ||  || — || May 27, 2000 || Socorro || LINEAR || — || align=right | 2.5 km || 
|-id=368 bgcolor=#fefefe
| 54368 ||  || — || May 23, 2000 || Anderson Mesa || LONEOS || — || align=right | 2.6 km || 
|-id=369 bgcolor=#d6d6d6
| 54369 ||  || — || May 27, 2000 || Socorro || LINEAR || EOS || align=right | 6.6 km || 
|-id=370 bgcolor=#d6d6d6
| 54370 ||  || — || May 27, 2000 || Socorro || LINEAR || EOS || align=right | 6.7 km || 
|-id=371 bgcolor=#fefefe
| 54371 ||  || — || May 23, 2000 || Anderson Mesa || LONEOS || NYS || align=right | 1.6 km || 
|-id=372 bgcolor=#d6d6d6
| 54372 ||  || — || May 28, 2000 || Socorro || LINEAR || — || align=right | 12 km || 
|-id=373 bgcolor=#E9E9E9
| 54373 ||  || — || May 27, 2000 || Anderson Mesa || LONEOS || EUN || align=right | 2.9 km || 
|-id=374 bgcolor=#fefefe
| 54374 ||  || — || May 27, 2000 || Socorro || LINEAR || V || align=right | 2.8 km || 
|-id=375 bgcolor=#d6d6d6
| 54375 ||  || — || May 27, 2000 || Socorro || LINEAR || — || align=right | 6.2 km || 
|-id=376 bgcolor=#fefefe
| 54376 ||  || — || May 27, 2000 || Socorro || LINEAR || NYS || align=right | 1.9 km || 
|-id=377 bgcolor=#E9E9E9
| 54377 ||  || — || May 24, 2000 || Anderson Mesa || LONEOS || MAR || align=right | 2.5 km || 
|-id=378 bgcolor=#fefefe
| 54378 ||  || — || May 25, 2000 || Anderson Mesa || LONEOS || V || align=right | 2.4 km || 
|-id=379 bgcolor=#fefefe
| 54379 ||  || — || May 25, 2000 || Anderson Mesa || LONEOS || — || align=right | 2.7 km || 
|-id=380 bgcolor=#E9E9E9
| 54380 ||  || — || May 25, 2000 || Anderson Mesa || LONEOS || — || align=right | 2.8 km || 
|-id=381 bgcolor=#E9E9E9
| 54381 ||  || — || May 26, 2000 || Anderson Mesa || LONEOS || — || align=right | 4.2 km || 
|-id=382 bgcolor=#d6d6d6
| 54382 ||  || — || May 26, 2000 || Anderson Mesa || LONEOS || — || align=right | 6.8 km || 
|-id=383 bgcolor=#d6d6d6
| 54383 ||  || — || May 26, 2000 || Anderson Mesa || LONEOS || — || align=right | 6.9 km || 
|-id=384 bgcolor=#E9E9E9
| 54384 ||  || — || May 26, 2000 || Anderson Mesa || LONEOS || — || align=right | 2.6 km || 
|-id=385 bgcolor=#E9E9E9
| 54385 ||  || — || May 26, 2000 || Anderson Mesa || LONEOS || ADE || align=right | 5.2 km || 
|-id=386 bgcolor=#E9E9E9
| 54386 ||  || — || May 26, 2000 || Anderson Mesa || LONEOS || EUN || align=right | 3.1 km || 
|-id=387 bgcolor=#E9E9E9
| 54387 ||  || — || May 26, 2000 || Anderson Mesa || LONEOS || MAR || align=right | 3.7 km || 
|-id=388 bgcolor=#E9E9E9
| 54388 ||  || — || May 27, 2000 || Socorro || LINEAR || — || align=right | 4.3 km || 
|-id=389 bgcolor=#E9E9E9
| 54389 ||  || — || May 27, 2000 || Anderson Mesa || LONEOS || MAR || align=right | 2.2 km || 
|-id=390 bgcolor=#fefefe
| 54390 ||  || — || May 28, 2000 || Socorro || LINEAR || PHO || align=right | 3.2 km || 
|-id=391 bgcolor=#E9E9E9
| 54391 Adammckay ||  ||  || May 31, 2000 || Anderson Mesa || LONEOS || WAT || align=right | 11 km || 
|-id=392 bgcolor=#d6d6d6
| 54392 ||  || — || May 28, 2000 || Socorro || LINEAR || KOR || align=right | 3.0 km || 
|-id=393 bgcolor=#E9E9E9
| 54393 ||  || — || May 28, 2000 || Socorro || LINEAR || — || align=right | 4.0 km || 
|-id=394 bgcolor=#E9E9E9
| 54394 ||  || — || May 28, 2000 || Socorro || LINEAR || — || align=right | 3.8 km || 
|-id=395 bgcolor=#fefefe
| 54395 ||  || — || May 27, 2000 || Socorro || LINEAR || — || align=right | 2.1 km || 
|-id=396 bgcolor=#d6d6d6
| 54396 ||  || — || May 27, 2000 || Socorro || LINEAR || HYG || align=right | 8.9 km || 
|-id=397 bgcolor=#fefefe
| 54397 ||  || — || May 27, 2000 || Socorro || LINEAR || — || align=right | 1.8 km || 
|-id=398 bgcolor=#E9E9E9
| 54398 ||  || — || May 23, 2000 || Anderson Mesa || LONEOS || — || align=right | 3.8 km || 
|-id=399 bgcolor=#fefefe
| 54399 ||  || — || May 26, 2000 || Anderson Mesa || LONEOS || V || align=right | 2.4 km || 
|-id=400 bgcolor=#E9E9E9
| 54400 || 2000 LD || — || June 1, 2000 || Prescott || P. G. Comba || — || align=right | 4.7 km || 
|}

54401–54500 

|-bgcolor=#FFC2E0
| 54401 || 2000 LM || — || June 1, 2000 || Socorro || LINEAR || AMO +1km || align=right | 1.2 km || 
|-id=402 bgcolor=#d6d6d6
| 54402 ||  || — || June 4, 2000 || Reedy Creek || J. Broughton || EOS || align=right | 5.8 km || 
|-id=403 bgcolor=#E9E9E9
| 54403 ||  || — || June 4, 2000 || Reedy Creek || J. Broughton || — || align=right | 6.2 km || 
|-id=404 bgcolor=#E9E9E9
| 54404 ||  || — || June 4, 2000 || Socorro || LINEAR || — || align=right | 4.6 km || 
|-id=405 bgcolor=#E9E9E9
| 54405 ||  || — || June 4, 2000 || Socorro || LINEAR || GEF || align=right | 3.2 km || 
|-id=406 bgcolor=#E9E9E9
| 54406 ||  || — || June 5, 2000 || Socorro || LINEAR || — || align=right | 4.1 km || 
|-id=407 bgcolor=#E9E9E9
| 54407 ||  || — || June 1, 2000 || Kitt Peak || Spacewatch || — || align=right | 2.7 km || 
|-id=408 bgcolor=#d6d6d6
| 54408 ||  || — || June 1, 2000 || Kitt Peak || Spacewatch || — || align=right | 6.0 km || 
|-id=409 bgcolor=#fefefe
| 54409 ||  || — || June 6, 2000 || Socorro || LINEAR || — || align=right | 1.7 km || 
|-id=410 bgcolor=#fefefe
| 54410 ||  || — || June 5, 2000 || Socorro || LINEAR || NYS || align=right | 2.6 km || 
|-id=411 bgcolor=#d6d6d6
| 54411 Bobestelle ||  ||  || June 3, 2000 || Mauna Kea || P. B. Stetson, D. D. Balam || — || align=right | 7.6 km || 
|-id=412 bgcolor=#E9E9E9
| 54412 ||  || — || June 4, 2000 || Socorro || LINEAR || — || align=right | 5.2 km || 
|-id=413 bgcolor=#E9E9E9
| 54413 ||  || — || June 4, 2000 || Socorro || LINEAR || — || align=right | 7.0 km || 
|-id=414 bgcolor=#d6d6d6
| 54414 ||  || — || June 5, 2000 || Socorro || LINEAR || EOS || align=right | 6.5 km || 
|-id=415 bgcolor=#d6d6d6
| 54415 ||  || — || June 6, 2000 || Socorro || LINEAR || EOS || align=right | 6.2 km || 
|-id=416 bgcolor=#E9E9E9
| 54416 ||  || — || June 7, 2000 || Socorro || LINEAR || — || align=right | 2.7 km || 
|-id=417 bgcolor=#fefefe
| 54417 ||  || — || June 5, 2000 || Socorro || LINEAR || V || align=right | 1.9 km || 
|-id=418 bgcolor=#E9E9E9
| 54418 ||  || — || June 7, 2000 || Socorro || LINEAR || EUN || align=right | 6.4 km || 
|-id=419 bgcolor=#fefefe
| 54419 ||  || — || June 8, 2000 || Socorro || LINEAR || — || align=right | 4.3 km || 
|-id=420 bgcolor=#fefefe
| 54420 ||  || — || June 8, 2000 || Socorro || LINEAR || — || align=right | 3.9 km || 
|-id=421 bgcolor=#E9E9E9
| 54421 ||  || — || June 1, 2000 || Anderson Mesa || LONEOS || EUN || align=right | 4.1 km || 
|-id=422 bgcolor=#E9E9E9
| 54422 ||  || — || June 3, 2000 || Anderson Mesa || LONEOS || — || align=right | 4.5 km || 
|-id=423 bgcolor=#d6d6d6
| 54423 ||  || — || June 1, 2000 || Socorro || LINEAR || ALA || align=right | 12 km || 
|-id=424 bgcolor=#E9E9E9
| 54424 ||  || — || June 1, 2000 || Socorro || LINEAR || — || align=right | 4.3 km || 
|-id=425 bgcolor=#E9E9E9
| 54425 ||  || — || June 1, 2000 || Socorro || LINEAR || — || align=right | 6.6 km || 
|-id=426 bgcolor=#d6d6d6
| 54426 ||  || — || June 7, 2000 || Socorro || LINEAR || — || align=right | 4.8 km || 
|-id=427 bgcolor=#d6d6d6
| 54427 ||  || — || June 6, 2000 || Anderson Mesa || LONEOS || — || align=right | 7.4 km || 
|-id=428 bgcolor=#d6d6d6
| 54428 ||  || — || June 6, 2000 || Anderson Mesa || LONEOS || URS || align=right | 17 km || 
|-id=429 bgcolor=#E9E9E9
| 54429 ||  || — || June 9, 2000 || Anderson Mesa || LONEOS || — || align=right | 6.6 km || 
|-id=430 bgcolor=#E9E9E9
| 54430 ||  || — || June 7, 2000 || Socorro || LINEAR || — || align=right | 4.6 km || 
|-id=431 bgcolor=#fefefe
| 54431 ||  || — || June 6, 2000 || Anderson Mesa || LONEOS || V || align=right | 1.3 km || 
|-id=432 bgcolor=#E9E9E9
| 54432 ||  || — || June 6, 2000 || Anderson Mesa || LONEOS || EUN || align=right | 6.7 km || 
|-id=433 bgcolor=#d6d6d6
| 54433 ||  || — || June 5, 2000 || Anderson Mesa || LONEOS || EOS || align=right | 4.9 km || 
|-id=434 bgcolor=#E9E9E9
| 54434 ||  || — || June 4, 2000 || Haleakala || NEAT || — || align=right | 4.5 km || 
|-id=435 bgcolor=#d6d6d6
| 54435 ||  || — || June 1, 2000 || Anderson Mesa || LONEOS || — || align=right | 9.0 km || 
|-id=436 bgcolor=#E9E9E9
| 54436 ||  || — || June 1, 2000 || Haleakala || NEAT || — || align=right | 7.4 km || 
|-id=437 bgcolor=#E9E9E9
| 54437 || 2000 MW || — || June 24, 2000 || Reedy Creek || J. Broughton || MAR || align=right | 4.1 km || 
|-id=438 bgcolor=#E9E9E9
| 54438 ||  || — || June 25, 2000 || Farpoint || Farpoint Obs. || — || align=right | 3.6 km || 
|-id=439 bgcolor=#E9E9E9
| 54439 Topeka ||  ||  || June 29, 2000 || Farpoint || G. Hug || — || align=right | 3.6 km || 
|-id=440 bgcolor=#E9E9E9
| 54440 ||  || — || June 24, 2000 || Socorro || LINEAR || — || align=right | 3.1 km || 
|-id=441 bgcolor=#E9E9E9
| 54441 ||  || — || June 26, 2000 || Socorro || LINEAR || — || align=right | 5.3 km || 
|-id=442 bgcolor=#E9E9E9
| 54442 ||  || — || June 25, 2000 || Socorro || LINEAR || — || align=right | 6.0 km || 
|-id=443 bgcolor=#fefefe
| 54443 ||  || — || June 25, 2000 || Socorro || LINEAR || PHO || align=right | 3.7 km || 
|-id=444 bgcolor=#d6d6d6
| 54444 ||  || — || June 25, 2000 || Socorro || LINEAR || ALA || align=right | 17 km || 
|-id=445 bgcolor=#E9E9E9
| 54445 ||  || — || June 25, 2000 || Socorro || LINEAR || — || align=right | 5.5 km || 
|-id=446 bgcolor=#E9E9E9
| 54446 ||  || — || June 23, 2000 || Kitt Peak || Spacewatch || MRX || align=right | 2.6 km || 
|-id=447 bgcolor=#E9E9E9
| 54447 ||  || — || July 5, 2000 || Reedy Creek || J. Broughton || MAR || align=right | 4.0 km || 
|-id=448 bgcolor=#fefefe
| 54448 ||  || — || July 6, 2000 || Socorro || LINEAR || PHO || align=right | 6.3 km || 
|-id=449 bgcolor=#E9E9E9
| 54449 ||  || — || July 5, 2000 || Kitt Peak || Spacewatch || GEF || align=right | 3.8 km || 
|-id=450 bgcolor=#E9E9E9
| 54450 ||  || — || July 6, 2000 || Anderson Mesa || LONEOS || GEF || align=right | 3.0 km || 
|-id=451 bgcolor=#d6d6d6
| 54451 ||  || — || July 6, 2000 || Anderson Mesa || LONEOS || — || align=right | 12 km || 
|-id=452 bgcolor=#E9E9E9
| 54452 ||  || — || July 5, 2000 || Anderson Mesa || LONEOS || — || align=right | 5.7 km || 
|-id=453 bgcolor=#d6d6d6
| 54453 ||  || — || July 5, 2000 || Anderson Mesa || LONEOS || EOS || align=right | 6.4 km || 
|-id=454 bgcolor=#d6d6d6
| 54454 ||  || — || July 5, 2000 || Anderson Mesa || LONEOS || KOR || align=right | 3.9 km || 
|-id=455 bgcolor=#E9E9E9
| 54455 ||  || — || July 5, 2000 || Anderson Mesa || LONEOS || — || align=right | 3.0 km || 
|-id=456 bgcolor=#d6d6d6
| 54456 ||  || — || July 5, 2000 || Anderson Mesa || LONEOS || URS || align=right | 5.3 km || 
|-id=457 bgcolor=#E9E9E9
| 54457 ||  || — || July 5, 2000 || Kitt Peak || Spacewatch || — || align=right | 6.8 km || 
|-id=458 bgcolor=#E9E9E9
| 54458 ||  || — || July 4, 2000 || Anderson Mesa || LONEOS || — || align=right | 4.5 km || 
|-id=459 bgcolor=#E9E9E9
| 54459 ||  || — || July 4, 2000 || Anderson Mesa || LONEOS || — || align=right | 3.5 km || 
|-id=460 bgcolor=#d6d6d6
| 54460 ||  || — || July 2, 2000 || Kitt Peak || Spacewatch || — || align=right | 7.6 km || 
|-id=461 bgcolor=#d6d6d6
| 54461 ||  || — || July 2, 2000 || Kitt Peak || Spacewatch || — || align=right | 12 km || 
|-id=462 bgcolor=#E9E9E9
| 54462 ||  || — || July 4, 2000 || Anderson Mesa || LONEOS || — || align=right | 6.8 km || 
|-id=463 bgcolor=#fefefe
| 54463 ||  || — || July 27, 2000 || Reedy Creek || J. Broughton || — || align=right | 2.9 km || 
|-id=464 bgcolor=#d6d6d6
| 54464 ||  || — || July 23, 2000 || Socorro || LINEAR || EOS || align=right | 6.0 km || 
|-id=465 bgcolor=#E9E9E9
| 54465 ||  || — || July 24, 2000 || Socorro || LINEAR || — || align=right | 6.6 km || 
|-id=466 bgcolor=#E9E9E9
| 54466 ||  || — || July 24, 2000 || Socorro || LINEAR || EUN || align=right | 4.3 km || 
|-id=467 bgcolor=#E9E9E9
| 54467 ||  || — || July 24, 2000 || Socorro || LINEAR || — || align=right | 5.6 km || 
|-id=468 bgcolor=#E9E9E9
| 54468 ||  || — || July 29, 2000 || Črni Vrh || Črni Vrh || EUN || align=right | 3.5 km || 
|-id=469 bgcolor=#d6d6d6
| 54469 ||  || — || July 30, 2000 || Črni Vrh || Črni Vrh || EOS || align=right | 4.9 km || 
|-id=470 bgcolor=#E9E9E9
| 54470 ||  || — || July 23, 2000 || Socorro || LINEAR || — || align=right | 5.1 km || 
|-id=471 bgcolor=#E9E9E9
| 54471 ||  || — || July 23, 2000 || Socorro || LINEAR || WIT || align=right | 3.2 km || 
|-id=472 bgcolor=#d6d6d6
| 54472 ||  || — || July 23, 2000 || Socorro || LINEAR || KOR || align=right | 3.8 km || 
|-id=473 bgcolor=#d6d6d6
| 54473 ||  || — || July 23, 2000 || Socorro || LINEAR || EOS || align=right | 8.1 km || 
|-id=474 bgcolor=#d6d6d6
| 54474 ||  || — || July 23, 2000 || Socorro || LINEAR || — || align=right | 6.4 km || 
|-id=475 bgcolor=#E9E9E9
| 54475 ||  || — || July 23, 2000 || Socorro || LINEAR || — || align=right | 6.4 km || 
|-id=476 bgcolor=#d6d6d6
| 54476 ||  || — || July 23, 2000 || Socorro || LINEAR || — || align=right | 14 km || 
|-id=477 bgcolor=#E9E9E9
| 54477 ||  || — || July 23, 2000 || Socorro || LINEAR || — || align=right | 7.2 km || 
|-id=478 bgcolor=#d6d6d6
| 54478 ||  || — || July 23, 2000 || Socorro || LINEAR || — || align=right | 9.0 km || 
|-id=479 bgcolor=#d6d6d6
| 54479 ||  || — || July 23, 2000 || Socorro || LINEAR || — || align=right | 5.2 km || 
|-id=480 bgcolor=#E9E9E9
| 54480 ||  || — || July 23, 2000 || Socorro || LINEAR || RAF || align=right | 3.4 km || 
|-id=481 bgcolor=#E9E9E9
| 54481 ||  || — || July 23, 2000 || Socorro || LINEAR || EUN || align=right | 4.4 km || 
|-id=482 bgcolor=#E9E9E9
| 54482 ||  || — || July 23, 2000 || Socorro || LINEAR || — || align=right | 4.9 km || 
|-id=483 bgcolor=#fefefe
| 54483 ||  || — || July 23, 2000 || Socorro || LINEAR || — || align=right | 2.2 km || 
|-id=484 bgcolor=#E9E9E9
| 54484 ||  || — || July 23, 2000 || Socorro || LINEAR || — || align=right | 5.5 km || 
|-id=485 bgcolor=#E9E9E9
| 54485 ||  || — || July 23, 2000 || Socorro || LINEAR || — || align=right | 5.7 km || 
|-id=486 bgcolor=#d6d6d6
| 54486 ||  || — || July 30, 2000 || Socorro || LINEAR || EOS || align=right | 4.8 km || 
|-id=487 bgcolor=#d6d6d6
| 54487 ||  || — || July 30, 2000 || Socorro || LINEAR || EOS || align=right | 4.7 km || 
|-id=488 bgcolor=#d6d6d6
| 54488 ||  || — || July 30, 2000 || Socorro || LINEAR || — || align=right | 5.9 km || 
|-id=489 bgcolor=#E9E9E9
| 54489 ||  || — || July 30, 2000 || Socorro || LINEAR || MAR || align=right | 3.3 km || 
|-id=490 bgcolor=#E9E9E9
| 54490 ||  || — || July 30, 2000 || Socorro || LINEAR || GEF || align=right | 4.0 km || 
|-id=491 bgcolor=#d6d6d6
| 54491 ||  || — || July 30, 2000 || Socorro || LINEAR || EOS || align=right | 4.4 km || 
|-id=492 bgcolor=#d6d6d6
| 54492 ||  || — || July 23, 2000 || Socorro || LINEAR || URS || align=right | 4.3 km || 
|-id=493 bgcolor=#d6d6d6
| 54493 ||  || — || July 30, 2000 || Socorro || LINEAR || — || align=right | 3.2 km || 
|-id=494 bgcolor=#d6d6d6
| 54494 ||  || — || July 30, 2000 || Socorro || LINEAR || — || align=right | 4.7 km || 
|-id=495 bgcolor=#E9E9E9
| 54495 ||  || — || July 30, 2000 || Socorro || LINEAR || — || align=right | 4.8 km || 
|-id=496 bgcolor=#d6d6d6
| 54496 ||  || — || July 30, 2000 || Socorro || LINEAR || — || align=right | 8.9 km || 
|-id=497 bgcolor=#d6d6d6
| 54497 ||  || — || July 30, 2000 || Socorro || LINEAR || — || align=right | 5.2 km || 
|-id=498 bgcolor=#d6d6d6
| 54498 ||  || — || July 30, 2000 || Socorro || LINEAR || — || align=right | 9.1 km || 
|-id=499 bgcolor=#d6d6d6
| 54499 ||  || — || July 30, 2000 || Socorro || LINEAR || — || align=right | 4.4 km || 
|-id=500 bgcolor=#E9E9E9
| 54500 ||  || — || July 30, 2000 || Socorro || LINEAR || MAR || align=right | 3.3 km || 
|}

54501–54600 

|-bgcolor=#E9E9E9
| 54501 ||  || — || July 31, 2000 || Socorro || LINEAR || MAR || align=right | 5.1 km || 
|-id=502 bgcolor=#fefefe
| 54502 ||  || — || July 31, 2000 || Socorro || LINEAR || FLO || align=right | 2.5 km || 
|-id=503 bgcolor=#d6d6d6
| 54503 ||  || — || July 30, 2000 || Socorro || LINEAR || URS || align=right | 10 km || 
|-id=504 bgcolor=#d6d6d6
| 54504 ||  || — || July 29, 2000 || Anderson Mesa || LONEOS || KOR || align=right | 4.0 km || 
|-id=505 bgcolor=#d6d6d6
| 54505 ||  || — || July 29, 2000 || Anderson Mesa || LONEOS || KOR || align=right | 3.3 km || 
|-id=506 bgcolor=#d6d6d6
| 54506 ||  || — || July 29, 2000 || Anderson Mesa || LONEOS || — || align=right | 8.8 km || 
|-id=507 bgcolor=#E9E9E9
| 54507 ||  || — || July 29, 2000 || Anderson Mesa || LONEOS || — || align=right | 4.5 km || 
|-id=508 bgcolor=#E9E9E9
| 54508 ||  || — || August 1, 2000 || Socorro || LINEAR || — || align=right | 5.4 km || 
|-id=509 bgcolor=#FFC2E0
| 54509 YORP ||  ||  || August 3, 2000 || Socorro || LINEAR || APOfastcritical || align=right data-sort-value="0.10" | 100 m || 
|-id=510 bgcolor=#E9E9E9
| 54510 Yakagehonjin ||  ||  || August 6, 2000 || Bisei SG Center || BATTeRS || — || align=right | 5.6 km || 
|-id=511 bgcolor=#d6d6d6
| 54511 ||  || — || August 1, 2000 || Socorro || LINEAR || — || align=right | 3.9 km || 
|-id=512 bgcolor=#E9E9E9
| 54512 ||  || — || August 1, 2000 || Socorro || LINEAR || — || align=right | 5.9 km || 
|-id=513 bgcolor=#d6d6d6
| 54513 ||  || — || August 1, 2000 || Socorro || LINEAR || — || align=right | 6.9 km || 
|-id=514 bgcolor=#d6d6d6
| 54514 ||  || — || August 1, 2000 || Socorro || LINEAR || Tj (2.89) || align=right | 15 km || 
|-id=515 bgcolor=#E9E9E9
| 54515 ||  || — || August 1, 2000 || Socorro || LINEAR || — || align=right | 5.2 km || 
|-id=516 bgcolor=#d6d6d6
| 54516 ||  || — || August 1, 2000 || Socorro || LINEAR || — || align=right | 12 km || 
|-id=517 bgcolor=#d6d6d6
| 54517 ||  || — || August 1, 2000 || Socorro || LINEAR || EOS || align=right | 3.8 km || 
|-id=518 bgcolor=#d6d6d6
| 54518 ||  || — || August 4, 2000 || Haleakala || NEAT || — || align=right | 11 km || 
|-id=519 bgcolor=#E9E9E9
| 54519 ||  || — || August 1, 2000 || Socorro || LINEAR || GEF || align=right | 3.0 km || 
|-id=520 bgcolor=#C2E0FF
| 54520 ||  || — || August 5, 2000 || Mauna Kea || M. J. Holman || centaurcritical || align=right | 111 km || 
|-id=521 bgcolor=#d6d6d6
| 54521 Aladdin ||  ||  || August 23, 2000 || Reedy Creek || J. Broughton || — || align=right | 16 km || 
|-id=522 bgcolor=#d6d6d6
| 54522 Menaechmus ||  ||  || August 23, 2000 || Gnosca || S. Sposetti || EOS || align=right | 4.7 km || 
|-id=523 bgcolor=#d6d6d6
| 54523 ||  || — || August 24, 2000 || Socorro || LINEAR || — || align=right | 7.9 km || 
|-id=524 bgcolor=#E9E9E9
| 54524 ||  || — || August 24, 2000 || Socorro || LINEAR || — || align=right | 4.6 km || 
|-id=525 bgcolor=#d6d6d6
| 54525 ||  || — || August 24, 2000 || Socorro || LINEAR || — || align=right | 5.2 km || 
|-id=526 bgcolor=#d6d6d6
| 54526 ||  || — || August 24, 2000 || Socorro || LINEAR || HYG || align=right | 6.7 km || 
|-id=527 bgcolor=#d6d6d6
| 54527 ||  || — || August 24, 2000 || Socorro || LINEAR || KOR || align=right | 3.4 km || 
|-id=528 bgcolor=#E9E9E9
| 54528 ||  || — || August 24, 2000 || Socorro || LINEAR || — || align=right | 2.5 km || 
|-id=529 bgcolor=#d6d6d6
| 54529 ||  || — || August 24, 2000 || Socorro || LINEAR || — || align=right | 6.4 km || 
|-id=530 bgcolor=#E9E9E9
| 54530 ||  || — || August 27, 2000 || Reedy Creek || J. Broughton || — || align=right | 2.7 km || 
|-id=531 bgcolor=#E9E9E9
| 54531 ||  || — || August 26, 2000 || Socorro || LINEAR || EUN || align=right | 3.9 km || 
|-id=532 bgcolor=#fefefe
| 54532 ||  || — || August 28, 2000 || Višnjan Observatory || K. Korlević || NYS || align=right | 1.8 km || 
|-id=533 bgcolor=#d6d6d6
| 54533 ||  || — || August 24, 2000 || Socorro || LINEAR || 7:4 || align=right | 8.0 km || 
|-id=534 bgcolor=#d6d6d6
| 54534 ||  || — || August 24, 2000 || Socorro || LINEAR || HYG || align=right | 7.2 km || 
|-id=535 bgcolor=#d6d6d6
| 54535 ||  || — || August 24, 2000 || Socorro || LINEAR || — || align=right | 9.2 km || 
|-id=536 bgcolor=#E9E9E9
| 54536 ||  || — || August 24, 2000 || Socorro || LINEAR || — || align=right | 3.7 km || 
|-id=537 bgcolor=#fefefe
| 54537 ||  || — || August 24, 2000 || Socorro || LINEAR || — || align=right | 3.4 km || 
|-id=538 bgcolor=#d6d6d6
| 54538 ||  || — || August 24, 2000 || Socorro || LINEAR || — || align=right | 15 km || 
|-id=539 bgcolor=#d6d6d6
| 54539 ||  || — || August 26, 2000 || Socorro || LINEAR || — || align=right | 5.9 km || 
|-id=540 bgcolor=#d6d6d6
| 54540 ||  || — || August 26, 2000 || Socorro || LINEAR || EOS || align=right | 4.1 km || 
|-id=541 bgcolor=#fefefe
| 54541 ||  || — || August 26, 2000 || Socorro || LINEAR || — || align=right | 3.9 km || 
|-id=542 bgcolor=#fefefe
| 54542 ||  || — || August 26, 2000 || Socorro || LINEAR || — || align=right | 1.9 km || 
|-id=543 bgcolor=#E9E9E9
| 54543 ||  || — || August 26, 2000 || Socorro || LINEAR || EUN || align=right | 4.0 km || 
|-id=544 bgcolor=#d6d6d6
| 54544 ||  || — || August 28, 2000 || Socorro || LINEAR || — || align=right | 14 km || 
|-id=545 bgcolor=#d6d6d6
| 54545 ||  || — || August 28, 2000 || Socorro || LINEAR || — || align=right | 11 km || 
|-id=546 bgcolor=#d6d6d6
| 54546 ||  || — || August 30, 2000 || Kitt Peak || Spacewatch || — || align=right | 5.3 km || 
|-id=547 bgcolor=#d6d6d6
| 54547 ||  || — || August 24, 2000 || Socorro || LINEAR || 7:4 || align=right | 9.0 km || 
|-id=548 bgcolor=#d6d6d6
| 54548 ||  || — || August 24, 2000 || Socorro || LINEAR || EOS || align=right | 6.3 km || 
|-id=549 bgcolor=#d6d6d6
| 54549 ||  || — || August 25, 2000 || Socorro || LINEAR || — || align=right | 4.5 km || 
|-id=550 bgcolor=#d6d6d6
| 54550 ||  || — || August 25, 2000 || Socorro || LINEAR || EOS || align=right | 5.9 km || 
|-id=551 bgcolor=#d6d6d6
| 54551 ||  || — || August 25, 2000 || Socorro || LINEAR || MEL || align=right | 12 km || 
|-id=552 bgcolor=#d6d6d6
| 54552 ||  || — || August 28, 2000 || Socorro || LINEAR || VER || align=right | 8.3 km || 
|-id=553 bgcolor=#E9E9E9
| 54553 ||  || — || August 28, 2000 || Socorro || LINEAR || GEF || align=right | 3.7 km || 
|-id=554 bgcolor=#E9E9E9
| 54554 ||  || — || August 28, 2000 || Socorro || LINEAR || — || align=right | 9.3 km || 
|-id=555 bgcolor=#d6d6d6
| 54555 ||  || — || August 24, 2000 || Socorro || LINEAR || EOS || align=right | 5.5 km || 
|-id=556 bgcolor=#d6d6d6
| 54556 ||  || — || August 28, 2000 || Socorro || LINEAR || EOS || align=right | 8.3 km || 
|-id=557 bgcolor=#d6d6d6
| 54557 ||  || — || August 25, 2000 || Socorro || LINEAR || — || align=right | 8.2 km || 
|-id=558 bgcolor=#d6d6d6
| 54558 ||  || — || August 31, 2000 || Socorro || LINEAR || — || align=right | 5.0 km || 
|-id=559 bgcolor=#d6d6d6
| 54559 ||  || — || August 25, 2000 || Socorro || LINEAR || — || align=right | 9.6 km || 
|-id=560 bgcolor=#E9E9E9
| 54560 ||  || — || August 26, 2000 || Socorro || LINEAR || — || align=right | 8.1 km || 
|-id=561 bgcolor=#d6d6d6
| 54561 ||  || — || August 26, 2000 || Socorro || LINEAR || ALA || align=right | 6.9 km || 
|-id=562 bgcolor=#d6d6d6
| 54562 ||  || — || August 31, 2000 || Socorro || LINEAR || — || align=right | 13 km || 
|-id=563 bgcolor=#d6d6d6
| 54563 Kinokonasu ||  ||  || August 31, 2000 || Goodricke-Pigott || R. A. Tucker || — || align=right | 12 km || 
|-id=564 bgcolor=#d6d6d6
| 54564 ||  || — || August 30, 2000 || Bisei SG Center || BATTeRS || — || align=right | 5.6 km || 
|-id=565 bgcolor=#d6d6d6
| 54565 ||  || — || August 24, 2000 || Socorro || LINEAR || — || align=right | 11 km || 
|-id=566 bgcolor=#d6d6d6
| 54566 ||  || — || August 26, 2000 || Socorro || LINEAR || — || align=right | 6.2 km || 
|-id=567 bgcolor=#d6d6d6
| 54567 ||  || — || August 26, 2000 || Socorro || LINEAR || 7:4 || align=right | 9.6 km || 
|-id=568 bgcolor=#d6d6d6
| 54568 ||  || — || August 29, 2000 || Socorro || LINEAR || — || align=right | 8.4 km || 
|-id=569 bgcolor=#d6d6d6
| 54569 ||  || — || August 29, 2000 || Socorro || LINEAR || HYG || align=right | 7.0 km || 
|-id=570 bgcolor=#d6d6d6
| 54570 ||  || — || August 31, 2000 || Socorro || LINEAR || — || align=right | 5.8 km || 
|-id=571 bgcolor=#d6d6d6
| 54571 ||  || — || August 31, 2000 || Socorro || LINEAR || — || align=right | 9.7 km || 
|-id=572 bgcolor=#d6d6d6
| 54572 ||  || — || August 31, 2000 || Socorro || LINEAR || VER || align=right | 7.5 km || 
|-id=573 bgcolor=#d6d6d6
| 54573 ||  || — || August 31, 2000 || Socorro || LINEAR || — || align=right | 6.8 km || 
|-id=574 bgcolor=#d6d6d6
| 54574 ||  || — || August 31, 2000 || Socorro || LINEAR || — || align=right | 5.2 km || 
|-id=575 bgcolor=#d6d6d6
| 54575 ||  || — || August 31, 2000 || Socorro || LINEAR || — || align=right | 7.7 km || 
|-id=576 bgcolor=#d6d6d6
| 54576 ||  || — || August 31, 2000 || Socorro || LINEAR || EMA || align=right | 9.9 km || 
|-id=577 bgcolor=#d6d6d6
| 54577 ||  || — || August 31, 2000 || Socorro || LINEAR || EOS || align=right | 4.6 km || 
|-id=578 bgcolor=#d6d6d6
| 54578 ||  || — || August 31, 2000 || Socorro || LINEAR || — || align=right | 7.8 km || 
|-id=579 bgcolor=#d6d6d6
| 54579 ||  || — || August 31, 2000 || Socorro || LINEAR || — || align=right | 4.6 km || 
|-id=580 bgcolor=#d6d6d6
| 54580 ||  || — || August 31, 2000 || Socorro || LINEAR || — || align=right | 4.0 km || 
|-id=581 bgcolor=#C2FFFF
| 54581 ||  || — || August 31, 2000 || Socorro || LINEAR || L5 || align=right | 14 km || 
|-id=582 bgcolor=#C2FFFF
| 54582 ||  || — || August 31, 2000 || Socorro || LINEAR || L5 || align=right | 17 km || 
|-id=583 bgcolor=#fefefe
| 54583 ||  || — || August 31, 2000 || Socorro || LINEAR || V || align=right | 2.4 km || 
|-id=584 bgcolor=#fefefe
| 54584 ||  || — || August 31, 2000 || Socorro || LINEAR || — || align=right | 3.2 km || 
|-id=585 bgcolor=#E9E9E9
| 54585 ||  || — || August 26, 2000 || Socorro || LINEAR || — || align=right | 4.4 km || 
|-id=586 bgcolor=#d6d6d6
| 54586 ||  || — || August 26, 2000 || Socorro || LINEAR || — || align=right | 6.8 km || 
|-id=587 bgcolor=#d6d6d6
| 54587 ||  || — || August 26, 2000 || Socorro || LINEAR || — || align=right | 4.4 km || 
|-id=588 bgcolor=#d6d6d6
| 54588 ||  || — || August 26, 2000 || Socorro || LINEAR || — || align=right | 9.3 km || 
|-id=589 bgcolor=#E9E9E9
| 54589 ||  || — || August 26, 2000 || Socorro || LINEAR || — || align=right | 2.8 km || 
|-id=590 bgcolor=#d6d6d6
| 54590 ||  || — || August 29, 2000 || Socorro || LINEAR || — || align=right | 7.3 km || 
|-id=591 bgcolor=#E9E9E9
| 54591 ||  || — || August 29, 2000 || Socorro || LINEAR || — || align=right | 3.0 km || 
|-id=592 bgcolor=#d6d6d6
| 54592 ||  || — || August 31, 2000 || Socorro || LINEAR || VER || align=right | 7.4 km || 
|-id=593 bgcolor=#E9E9E9
| 54593 ||  || — || August 20, 2000 || Anderson Mesa || LONEOS || ADE || align=right | 4.9 km || 
|-id=594 bgcolor=#E9E9E9
| 54594 ||  || — || August 21, 2000 || Anderson Mesa || LONEOS || AGN || align=right | 2.8 km || 
|-id=595 bgcolor=#d6d6d6
| 54595 ||  || — || August 21, 2000 || Anderson Mesa || LONEOS || — || align=right | 4.9 km || 
|-id=596 bgcolor=#C2FFFF
| 54596 ||  || — || August 29, 2000 || Socorro || LINEAR || L5 || align=right | 18 km || 
|-id=597 bgcolor=#fefefe
| 54597 ||  || — || August 31, 2000 || Socorro || LINEAR || V || align=right | 1.5 km || 
|-id=598 bgcolor=#C7FF8F
| 54598 Bienor ||  ||  || August 27, 2000 || Cerro Tololo || DES || centaur || align=right | 188 km || 
|-id=599 bgcolor=#d6d6d6
| 54599 ||  || — || August 24, 2000 || Socorro || LINEAR || 3:2 || align=right | 6.9 km || 
|-id=600 bgcolor=#fefefe
| 54600 ||  || — || September 1, 2000 || Socorro || LINEAR || V || align=right | 2.8 km || 
|}

54601–54700 

|-bgcolor=#d6d6d6
| 54601 ||  || — || September 1, 2000 || Socorro || LINEAR || ALA || align=right | 8.1 km || 
|-id=602 bgcolor=#d6d6d6
| 54602 ||  || — || September 1, 2000 || Socorro || LINEAR || — || align=right | 5.5 km || 
|-id=603 bgcolor=#d6d6d6
| 54603 ||  || — || September 1, 2000 || Socorro || LINEAR || — || align=right | 10 km || 
|-id=604 bgcolor=#d6d6d6
| 54604 ||  || — || September 1, 2000 || Socorro || LINEAR || — || align=right | 8.2 km || 
|-id=605 bgcolor=#E9E9E9
| 54605 ||  || — || September 1, 2000 || Socorro || LINEAR || — || align=right | 4.7 km || 
|-id=606 bgcolor=#d6d6d6
| 54606 ||  || — || September 1, 2000 || Socorro || LINEAR || EOS || align=right | 7.1 km || 
|-id=607 bgcolor=#d6d6d6
| 54607 ||  || — || September 1, 2000 || Socorro || LINEAR || — || align=right | 6.1 km || 
|-id=608 bgcolor=#d6d6d6
| 54608 ||  || — || September 1, 2000 || Socorro || LINEAR || — || align=right | 7.3 km || 
|-id=609 bgcolor=#d6d6d6
| 54609 ||  || — || September 4, 2000 || Prescott || P. G. Comba || URS || align=right | 9.3 km || 
|-id=610 bgcolor=#E9E9E9
| 54610 ||  || — || September 6, 2000 || Bisei SG Center || BATTeRS || — || align=right | 8.5 km || 
|-id=611 bgcolor=#E9E9E9
| 54611 ||  || — || September 3, 2000 || Socorro || LINEAR || GEF || align=right | 3.5 km || 
|-id=612 bgcolor=#E9E9E9
| 54612 ||  || — || September 2, 2000 || Socorro || LINEAR || — || align=right | 5.7 km || 
|-id=613 bgcolor=#d6d6d6
| 54613 ||  || — || September 1, 2000 || Socorro || LINEAR || — || align=right | 12 km || 
|-id=614 bgcolor=#C2FFFF
| 54614 ||  || — || September 2, 2000 || Anderson Mesa || LONEOS || L5 || align=right | 13 km || 
|-id=615 bgcolor=#E9E9E9
| 54615 ||  || — || September 2, 2000 || Anderson Mesa || LONEOS || — || align=right | 3.9 km || 
|-id=616 bgcolor=#d6d6d6
| 54616 ||  || — || September 5, 2000 || Anderson Mesa || LONEOS || — || align=right | 11 km || 
|-id=617 bgcolor=#E9E9E9
| 54617 ||  || — || September 5, 2000 || Anderson Mesa || LONEOS || MIT || align=right | 8.8 km || 
|-id=618 bgcolor=#d6d6d6
| 54618 ||  || — || September 5, 2000 || Anderson Mesa || LONEOS || — || align=right | 13 km || 
|-id=619 bgcolor=#d6d6d6
| 54619 ||  || — || September 20, 2000 || Socorro || LINEAR || EOS || align=right | 5.2 km || 
|-id=620 bgcolor=#d6d6d6
| 54620 ||  || — || September 23, 2000 || Prescott || P. G. Comba || MEL || align=right | 12 km || 
|-id=621 bgcolor=#d6d6d6
| 54621 ||  || — || September 20, 2000 || Socorro || LINEAR || — || align=right | 4.4 km || 
|-id=622 bgcolor=#d6d6d6
| 54622 ||  || — || September 24, 2000 || Socorro || LINEAR || 7:4 || align=right | 9.3 km || 
|-id=623 bgcolor=#d6d6d6
| 54623 ||  || — || September 24, 2000 || Socorro || LINEAR || VER || align=right | 8.5 km || 
|-id=624 bgcolor=#d6d6d6
| 54624 ||  || — || September 22, 2000 || Socorro || LINEAR || — || align=right | 13 km || 
|-id=625 bgcolor=#C2FFFF
| 54625 ||  || — || September 23, 2000 || Socorro || LINEAR || L5 || align=right | 18 km || 
|-id=626 bgcolor=#C2FFFF
| 54626 ||  || — || September 23, 2000 || Socorro || LINEAR || L5 || align=right | 20 km || 
|-id=627 bgcolor=#fefefe
| 54627 ||  || — || September 24, 2000 || Socorro || LINEAR || FLO || align=right | 2.1 km || 
|-id=628 bgcolor=#d6d6d6
| 54628 ||  || — || September 24, 2000 || Socorro || LINEAR || 3:2 || align=right | 14 km || 
|-id=629 bgcolor=#d6d6d6
| 54629 ||  || — || September 23, 2000 || Socorro || LINEAR || URS || align=right | 12 km || 
|-id=630 bgcolor=#d6d6d6
| 54630 ||  || — || September 24, 2000 || Socorro || LINEAR || HIL3:2 || align=right | 16 km || 
|-id=631 bgcolor=#d6d6d6
| 54631 ||  || — || September 24, 2000 || Socorro || LINEAR || 3:2 || align=right | 17 km || 
|-id=632 bgcolor=#C2FFFF
| 54632 ||  || — || September 22, 2000 || Socorro || LINEAR || L5 || align=right | 20 km || 
|-id=633 bgcolor=#d6d6d6
| 54633 ||  || — || September 22, 2000 || Socorro || LINEAR || — || align=right | 7.5 km || 
|-id=634 bgcolor=#C2FFFF
| 54634 ||  || — || September 22, 2000 || Socorro || LINEAR || L5 || align=right | 18 km || 
|-id=635 bgcolor=#d6d6d6
| 54635 ||  || — || September 22, 2000 || Socorro || LINEAR || — || align=right | 12 km || 
|-id=636 bgcolor=#E9E9E9
| 54636 ||  || — || September 23, 2000 || Socorro || LINEAR || — || align=right | 6.6 km || 
|-id=637 bgcolor=#d6d6d6
| 54637 ||  || — || September 23, 2000 || Socorro || LINEAR || MEL || align=right | 11 km || 
|-id=638 bgcolor=#C2FFFF
| 54638 ||  || — || September 24, 2000 || Socorro || LINEAR || L5 || align=right | 15 km || 
|-id=639 bgcolor=#d6d6d6
| 54639 ||  || — || September 20, 2000 || Haleakala || NEAT || — || align=right | 5.1 km || 
|-id=640 bgcolor=#d6d6d6
| 54640 ||  || — || September 22, 2000 || Haleakala || NEAT || — || align=right | 8.9 km || 
|-id=641 bgcolor=#E9E9E9
| 54641 ||  || — || September 24, 2000 || Socorro || LINEAR || — || align=right | 7.2 km || 
|-id=642 bgcolor=#d6d6d6
| 54642 ||  || — || September 24, 2000 || Socorro || LINEAR || VER || align=right | 4.2 km || 
|-id=643 bgcolor=#C2FFFF
| 54643 ||  || — || September 23, 2000 || Socorro || LINEAR || L5 || align=right | 19 km || 
|-id=644 bgcolor=#d6d6d6
| 54644 ||  || — || September 23, 2000 || Socorro || LINEAR || HIL3:2 || align=right | 12 km || 
|-id=645 bgcolor=#C2FFFF
| 54645 ||  || — || September 23, 2000 || Socorro || LINEAR || L5 || align=right | 20 km || 
|-id=646 bgcolor=#C2FFFF
| 54646 ||  || — || September 27, 2000 || Socorro || LINEAR || L5 || align=right | 17 km || 
|-id=647 bgcolor=#d6d6d6
| 54647 ||  || — || September 30, 2000 || Socorro || LINEAR || THB || align=right | 9.6 km || 
|-id=648 bgcolor=#d6d6d6
| 54648 ||  || — || September 30, 2000 || Socorro || LINEAR || — || align=right | 12 km || 
|-id=649 bgcolor=#C2FFFF
| 54649 ||  || — || September 26, 2000 || Socorro || LINEAR || L5 || align=right | 21 km || 
|-id=650 bgcolor=#d6d6d6
| 54650 ||  || — || September 28, 2000 || Socorro || LINEAR || ALA || align=right | 15 km || 
|-id=651 bgcolor=#d6d6d6
| 54651 ||  || — || September 29, 2000 || Haleakala || NEAT || — || align=right | 9.8 km || 
|-id=652 bgcolor=#C2FFFF
| 54652 ||  || — || September 20, 2000 || Socorro || LINEAR || L5 || align=right | 16 km || 
|-id=653 bgcolor=#C2FFFF
| 54653 ||  || — || September 29, 2000 || Anderson Mesa || LONEOS || L5 || align=right | 20 km || 
|-id=654 bgcolor=#d6d6d6
| 54654 ||  || — || September 29, 2000 || Anderson Mesa || LONEOS || TIR || align=right | 7.3 km || 
|-id=655 bgcolor=#C2FFFF
| 54655 ||  || — || September 20, 2000 || Socorro || LINEAR || L5 || align=right | 19 km || 
|-id=656 bgcolor=#C2FFFF
| 54656 ||  || — || September 20, 2000 || Socorro || LINEAR || L5 || align=right | 38 km || 
|-id=657 bgcolor=#d6d6d6
| 54657 ||  || — || September 23, 2000 || Anderson Mesa || LONEOS || 3:2 || align=right | 12 km || 
|-id=658 bgcolor=#d6d6d6
| 54658 ||  || — || October 1, 2000 || Socorro || LINEAR || EOS || align=right | 6.8 km || 
|-id=659 bgcolor=#fefefe
| 54659 ||  || — || October 1, 2000 || Socorro || LINEAR || KLI || align=right | 5.1 km || 
|-id=660 bgcolor=#FFC2E0
| 54660 ||  || — || October 19, 2000 || Socorro || LINEAR || AMO +1km || align=right data-sort-value="0.95" | 950 m || 
|-id=661 bgcolor=#fefefe
| 54661 ||  || — || October 25, 2000 || Socorro || LINEAR || — || align=right | 2.3 km || 
|-id=662 bgcolor=#fefefe
| 54662 ||  || — || October 24, 2000 || Socorro || LINEAR || FLO || align=right | 1.9 km || 
|-id=663 bgcolor=#d6d6d6
| 54663 ||  || — || October 30, 2000 || Socorro || LINEAR || — || align=right | 5.9 km || 
|-id=664 bgcolor=#fefefe
| 54664 ||  || — || October 30, 2000 || Socorro || LINEAR || V || align=right | 1.6 km || 
|-id=665 bgcolor=#d6d6d6
| 54665 ||  || — || October 31, 2000 || Socorro || LINEAR || — || align=right | 13 km || 
|-id=666 bgcolor=#fefefe
| 54666 ||  || — || November 20, 2000 || Farpoint || Farpoint Obs. || FLO || align=right | 1.9 km || 
|-id=667 bgcolor=#fefefe
| 54667 ||  || — || November 20, 2000 || Socorro || LINEAR || V || align=right | 1.8 km || 
|-id=668 bgcolor=#fefefe
| 54668 ||  || — || November 20, 2000 || Socorro || LINEAR || V || align=right | 1.6 km || 
|-id=669 bgcolor=#fefefe
| 54669 ||  || — || November 21, 2000 || Socorro || LINEAR || NYS || align=right | 4.6 km || 
|-id=670 bgcolor=#fefefe
| 54670 ||  || — || November 21, 2000 || Socorro || LINEAR || — || align=right | 2.0 km || 
|-id=671 bgcolor=#d6d6d6
| 54671 ||  || — || November 26, 2000 || Socorro || LINEAR || — || align=right | 7.5 km || 
|-id=672 bgcolor=#C2FFFF
| 54672 ||  || — || November 28, 2000 || Haleakala || NEAT || L5 || align=right | 23 km || 
|-id=673 bgcolor=#E9E9E9
| 54673 ||  || — || November 18, 2000 || Anderson Mesa || LONEOS || — || align=right | 8.0 km || 
|-id=674 bgcolor=#d6d6d6
| 54674 ||  || — || December 1, 2000 || Socorro || LINEAR || EUP || align=right | 13 km || 
|-id=675 bgcolor=#E9E9E9
| 54675 ||  || — || December 4, 2000 || Socorro || LINEAR || — || align=right | 4.5 km || 
|-id=676 bgcolor=#E9E9E9
| 54676 ||  || — || December 25, 2000 || Ametlla de Mar || J. Nomen || — || align=right | 3.2 km || 
|-id=677 bgcolor=#E9E9E9
| 54677 ||  || — || December 30, 2000 || Socorro || LINEAR || HEN || align=right | 2.5 km || 
|-id=678 bgcolor=#C2FFFF
| 54678 ||  || — || December 30, 2000 || Socorro || LINEAR || L4 || align=right | 19 km || 
|-id=679 bgcolor=#fefefe
| 54679 ||  || — || December 30, 2000 || Socorro || LINEAR || — || align=right | 1.9 km || 
|-id=680 bgcolor=#C2FFFF
| 54680 ||  || — || January 2, 2001 || Socorro || LINEAR || L4 || align=right | 22 km || 
|-id=681 bgcolor=#fefefe
| 54681 ||  || — || January 15, 2001 || Socorro || LINEAR || — || align=right | 2.2 km || 
|-id=682 bgcolor=#d6d6d6
| 54682 ||  || — || January 19, 2001 || Socorro || LINEAR || — || align=right | 6.7 km || 
|-id=683 bgcolor=#fefefe
| 54683 ||  || — || February 2, 2001 || Socorro || LINEAR || H || align=right | 1.6 km || 
|-id=684 bgcolor=#fefefe
| 54684 ||  || — || February 3, 2001 || Socorro || LINEAR || H || align=right | 2.0 km || 
|-id=685 bgcolor=#E9E9E9
| 54685 ||  || — || February 13, 2001 || Socorro || LINEAR || EUN || align=right | 3.7 km || 
|-id=686 bgcolor=#FFC2E0
| 54686 ||  || — || February 17, 2001 || Socorro || LINEAR || AMO +1km || align=right | 1.3 km || 
|-id=687 bgcolor=#fefefe
| 54687 ||  || — || February 17, 2001 || Črni Vrh || Črni Vrh || — || align=right | 3.8 km || 
|-id=688 bgcolor=#fefefe
| 54688 ||  || — || February 19, 2001 || Socorro || LINEAR || — || align=right | 2.7 km || 
|-id=689 bgcolor=#C2FFFF
| 54689 ||  || — || February 16, 2001 || Socorro || LINEAR || L4 || align=right | 20 km || 
|-id=690 bgcolor=#FFC2E0
| 54690 || 2001 EB || — || March 1, 2001 || Socorro || LINEAR || AMO +1kmcritical || align=right | 1.4 km || 
|-id=691 bgcolor=#d6d6d6
| 54691 ||  || — || March 2, 2001 || Anderson Mesa || LONEOS || — || align=right | 5.0 km || 
|-id=692 bgcolor=#fefefe
| 54692 ||  || — || March 2, 2001 || Anderson Mesa || LONEOS || — || align=right | 1.9 km || 
|-id=693 bgcolor=#fefefe
| 54693 Garymyers ||  ||  || March 19, 2001 || Junk Bond || D. Healy || — || align=right | 2.2 km || 
|-id=694 bgcolor=#fefefe
| 54694 ||  || — || March 18, 2001 || Socorro || LINEAR || — || align=right | 2.1 km || 
|-id=695 bgcolor=#fefefe
| 54695 ||  || — || March 18, 2001 || Socorro || LINEAR || FLO || align=right | 2.7 km || 
|-id=696 bgcolor=#fefefe
| 54696 ||  || — || March 19, 2001 || Socorro || LINEAR || FLO || align=right | 1.7 km || 
|-id=697 bgcolor=#FA8072
| 54697 ||  || — || March 19, 2001 || Socorro || LINEAR || moon || align=right | 3.0 km || 
|-id=698 bgcolor=#fefefe
| 54698 ||  || — || March 19, 2001 || Socorro || LINEAR || — || align=right | 1.6 km || 
|-id=699 bgcolor=#E9E9E9
| 54699 ||  || — || March 21, 2001 || Anderson Mesa || LONEOS || WIT || align=right | 2.9 km || 
|-id=700 bgcolor=#fefefe
| 54700 ||  || — || March 23, 2001 || Anderson Mesa || LONEOS || — || align=right | 2.3 km || 
|}

54701–54800 

|-bgcolor=#fefefe
| 54701 ||  || — || March 24, 2001 || Anderson Mesa || LONEOS || FLO || align=right | 1.3 km || 
|-id=702 bgcolor=#fefefe
| 54702 ||  || — || March 29, 2001 || Anderson Mesa || LONEOS || — || align=right | 1.8 km || 
|-id=703 bgcolor=#fefefe
| 54703 ||  || — || March 29, 2001 || Anderson Mesa || LONEOS || V || align=right | 1.6 km || 
|-id=704 bgcolor=#E9E9E9
| 54704 ||  || — || March 24, 2001 || Haleakala || NEAT || — || align=right | 4.6 km || 
|-id=705 bgcolor=#fefefe
| 54705 ||  || — || April 15, 2001 || Haleakala || NEAT || FLO || align=right | 2.1 km || 
|-id=706 bgcolor=#fefefe
| 54706 ||  || — || April 17, 2001 || Socorro || LINEAR || — || align=right | 1.8 km || 
|-id=707 bgcolor=#fefefe
| 54707 ||  || — || April 18, 2001 || Socorro || LINEAR || — || align=right | 5.2 km || 
|-id=708 bgcolor=#fefefe
| 54708 ||  || — || April 21, 2001 || Socorro || LINEAR || H || align=right | 1.4 km || 
|-id=709 bgcolor=#fefefe
| 54709 ||  || — || April 21, 2001 || Socorro || LINEAR || — || align=right | 2.2 km || 
|-id=710 bgcolor=#fefefe
| 54710 ||  || — || April 21, 2001 || Socorro || LINEAR || NYS || align=right | 1.8 km || 
|-id=711 bgcolor=#fefefe
| 54711 ||  || — || April 21, 2001 || Kitt Peak || Spacewatch || NYS || align=right | 1.5 km || 
|-id=712 bgcolor=#fefefe
| 54712 ||  || — || April 27, 2001 || Socorro || LINEAR || — || align=right | 2.4 km || 
|-id=713 bgcolor=#fefefe
| 54713 ||  || — || April 29, 2001 || Socorro || LINEAR || — || align=right | 2.6 km || 
|-id=714 bgcolor=#fefefe
| 54714 ||  || — || April 26, 2001 || Desert Beaver || W. K. Y. Yeung || V || align=right | 1.8 km || 
|-id=715 bgcolor=#fefefe
| 54715 ||  || — || April 16, 2001 || Anderson Mesa || LONEOS || — || align=right | 1.9 km || 
|-id=716 bgcolor=#E9E9E9
| 54716 ||  || — || April 21, 2001 || Socorro || LINEAR || EUN || align=right | 3.7 km || 
|-id=717 bgcolor=#E9E9E9
| 54717 ||  || — || April 24, 2001 || Anderson Mesa || LONEOS || — || align=right | 4.8 km || 
|-id=718 bgcolor=#FA8072
| 54718 ||  || — || April 24, 2001 || Anderson Mesa || LONEOS || — || align=right | 2.6 km || 
|-id=719 bgcolor=#fefefe
| 54719 ||  || — || April 26, 2001 || Anderson Mesa || LONEOS || FLO || align=right | 1.9 km || 
|-id=720 bgcolor=#fefefe
| 54720 Kentstevens ||  ||  || May 15, 2001 || Badlands || R. Dyvig || FLO || align=right | 1.5 km || 
|-id=721 bgcolor=#fefefe
| 54721 ||  || — || May 15, 2001 || Haleakala || NEAT || — || align=right | 2.1 km || 
|-id=722 bgcolor=#fefefe
| 54722 ||  || — || May 15, 2001 || Haleakala || NEAT || NYS || align=right | 5.3 km || 
|-id=723 bgcolor=#E9E9E9
| 54723 ||  || — || May 16, 2001 || Haleakala || NEAT || MIT || align=right | 6.7 km || 
|-id=724 bgcolor=#fefefe
| 54724 ||  || — || May 17, 2001 || Socorro || LINEAR || NYS || align=right | 1.7 km || 
|-id=725 bgcolor=#fefefe
| 54725 ||  || — || May 17, 2001 || Socorro || LINEAR || — || align=right | 2.0 km || 
|-id=726 bgcolor=#fefefe
| 54726 ||  || — || May 18, 2001 || Socorro || LINEAR || — || align=right | 2.4 km || 
|-id=727 bgcolor=#E9E9E9
| 54727 ||  || — || May 18, 2001 || Socorro || LINEAR || — || align=right | 2.8 km || 
|-id=728 bgcolor=#E9E9E9
| 54728 ||  || — || May 18, 2001 || Socorro || LINEAR || — || align=right | 3.1 km || 
|-id=729 bgcolor=#E9E9E9
| 54729 ||  || — || May 18, 2001 || Socorro || LINEAR || — || align=right | 3.4 km || 
|-id=730 bgcolor=#E9E9E9
| 54730 ||  || — || May 18, 2001 || Socorro || LINEAR || — || align=right | 8.9 km || 
|-id=731 bgcolor=#fefefe
| 54731 ||  || — || May 18, 2001 || Socorro || LINEAR || FLO || align=right | 1.5 km || 
|-id=732 bgcolor=#fefefe
| 54732 ||  || — || May 21, 2001 || Socorro || LINEAR || — || align=right | 2.2 km || 
|-id=733 bgcolor=#E9E9E9
| 54733 ||  || — || May 21, 2001 || Socorro || LINEAR || — || align=right | 4.9 km || 
|-id=734 bgcolor=#d6d6d6
| 54734 ||  || — || May 23, 2001 || Desert Beaver || W. K. Y. Yeung || — || align=right | 3.8 km || 
|-id=735 bgcolor=#fefefe
| 54735 ||  || — || May 17, 2001 || Socorro || LINEAR || — || align=right | 1.9 km || 
|-id=736 bgcolor=#fefefe
| 54736 ||  || — || May 17, 2001 || Socorro || LINEAR || — || align=right | 1.7 km || 
|-id=737 bgcolor=#E9E9E9
| 54737 ||  || — || May 17, 2001 || Socorro || LINEAR || — || align=right | 4.1 km || 
|-id=738 bgcolor=#fefefe
| 54738 ||  || — || May 17, 2001 || Socorro || LINEAR || — || align=right | 2.0 km || 
|-id=739 bgcolor=#fefefe
| 54739 ||  || — || May 21, 2001 || Socorro || LINEAR || — || align=right | 4.2 km || 
|-id=740 bgcolor=#fefefe
| 54740 ||  || — || May 22, 2001 || Socorro || LINEAR || PHO || align=right | 4.7 km || 
|-id=741 bgcolor=#fefefe
| 54741 ||  || — || May 22, 2001 || Socorro || LINEAR || V || align=right | 1.4 km || 
|-id=742 bgcolor=#E9E9E9
| 54742 ||  || — || May 18, 2001 || Socorro || LINEAR || — || align=right | 4.9 km || 
|-id=743 bgcolor=#fefefe
| 54743 ||  || — || May 21, 2001 || Socorro || LINEAR || — || align=right | 1.9 km || 
|-id=744 bgcolor=#d6d6d6
| 54744 ||  || — || May 21, 2001 || Socorro || LINEAR || — || align=right | 6.7 km || 
|-id=745 bgcolor=#E9E9E9
| 54745 ||  || — || May 22, 2001 || Socorro || LINEAR || — || align=right | 5.4 km || 
|-id=746 bgcolor=#E9E9E9
| 54746 ||  || — || May 22, 2001 || Socorro || LINEAR || — || align=right | 4.8 km || 
|-id=747 bgcolor=#fefefe
| 54747 ||  || — || May 21, 2001 || Kitt Peak || Spacewatch || V || align=right | 1.7 km || 
|-id=748 bgcolor=#E9E9E9
| 54748 ||  || — || May 22, 2001 || Socorro || LINEAR || — || align=right | 3.0 km || 
|-id=749 bgcolor=#fefefe
| 54749 ||  || — || May 22, 2001 || Socorro || LINEAR || FLO || align=right | 2.7 km || 
|-id=750 bgcolor=#d6d6d6
| 54750 ||  || — || May 22, 2001 || Socorro || LINEAR || — || align=right | 11 km || 
|-id=751 bgcolor=#fefefe
| 54751 ||  || — || May 22, 2001 || Socorro || LINEAR || — || align=right | 2.1 km || 
|-id=752 bgcolor=#fefefe
| 54752 ||  || — || May 24, 2001 || Socorro || LINEAR || V || align=right | 1.5 km || 
|-id=753 bgcolor=#fefefe
| 54753 ||  || — || May 24, 2001 || Socorro || LINEAR || FLO || align=right | 2.2 km || 
|-id=754 bgcolor=#FA8072
| 54754 ||  || — || May 22, 2001 || Socorro || LINEAR || — || align=right | 3.7 km || 
|-id=755 bgcolor=#d6d6d6
| 54755 ||  || — || May 23, 2001 || Socorro || LINEAR || — || align=right | 3.9 km || 
|-id=756 bgcolor=#d6d6d6
| 54756 ||  || — || May 26, 2001 || Socorro || LINEAR || — || align=right | 4.9 km || 
|-id=757 bgcolor=#fefefe
| 54757 ||  || — || May 26, 2001 || Socorro || LINEAR || — || align=right | 2.7 km || 
|-id=758 bgcolor=#E9E9E9
| 54758 ||  || — || May 26, 2001 || Socorro || LINEAR || ADE || align=right | 6.6 km || 
|-id=759 bgcolor=#E9E9E9
| 54759 ||  || — || May 26, 2001 || Socorro || LINEAR || EUN || align=right | 4.1 km || 
|-id=760 bgcolor=#E9E9E9
| 54760 ||  || — || May 26, 2001 || Socorro || LINEAR || — || align=right | 5.9 km || 
|-id=761 bgcolor=#fefefe
| 54761 ||  || — || May 22, 2001 || Socorro || LINEAR || NYS || align=right | 1.6 km || 
|-id=762 bgcolor=#E9E9E9
| 54762 ||  || — || May 24, 2001 || Anderson Mesa || LONEOS || EUN || align=right | 2.9 km || 
|-id=763 bgcolor=#E9E9E9
| 54763 ||  || — || May 29, 2001 || Socorro || LINEAR || — || align=right | 3.1 km || 
|-id=764 bgcolor=#fefefe
| 54764 ||  || — || June 13, 2001 || Socorro || LINEAR || FLO || align=right | 1.9 km || 
|-id=765 bgcolor=#E9E9E9
| 54765 ||  || — || June 15, 2001 || Palomar || NEAT || — || align=right | 2.8 km || 
|-id=766 bgcolor=#fefefe
| 54766 ||  || — || June 14, 2001 || Palomar || NEAT || MAS || align=right | 2.2 km || 
|-id=767 bgcolor=#fefefe
| 54767 ||  || — || June 15, 2001 || Palomar || NEAT || V || align=right | 2.2 km || 
|-id=768 bgcolor=#E9E9E9
| 54768 ||  || — || June 15, 2001 || Palomar || NEAT || GEF || align=right | 2.9 km || 
|-id=769 bgcolor=#E9E9E9
| 54769 ||  || — || June 15, 2001 || Palomar || NEAT || — || align=right | 3.5 km || 
|-id=770 bgcolor=#fefefe
| 54770 ||  || — || June 15, 2001 || Socorro || LINEAR || — || align=right | 2.4 km || 
|-id=771 bgcolor=#E9E9E9
| 54771 ||  || — || June 15, 2001 || Socorro || LINEAR || MAR || align=right | 3.0 km || 
|-id=772 bgcolor=#fefefe
| 54772 ||  || — || June 15, 2001 || Socorro || LINEAR || — || align=right | 2.5 km || 
|-id=773 bgcolor=#fefefe
| 54773 ||  || — || June 15, 2001 || Socorro || LINEAR || — || align=right | 2.4 km || 
|-id=774 bgcolor=#E9E9E9
| 54774 ||  || — || June 15, 2001 || Palomar || NEAT || — || align=right | 3.6 km || 
|-id=775 bgcolor=#E9E9E9
| 54775 ||  || — || June 14, 2001 || Palomar || NEAT || — || align=right | 2.8 km || 
|-id=776 bgcolor=#E9E9E9
| 54776 ||  || — || June 14, 2001 || Palomar || NEAT || — || align=right | 4.4 km || 
|-id=777 bgcolor=#fefefe
| 54777 ||  || — || June 15, 2001 || Kitt Peak || Spacewatch || — || align=right | 2.0 km || 
|-id=778 bgcolor=#fefefe
| 54778 ||  || — || June 15, 2001 || Socorro || LINEAR || — || align=right | 2.7 km || 
|-id=779 bgcolor=#fefefe
| 54779 ||  || — || June 15, 2001 || Palomar || NEAT || V || align=right | 2.4 km || 
|-id=780 bgcolor=#fefefe
| 54780 ||  || — || June 15, 2001 || Socorro || LINEAR || — || align=right | 2.0 km || 
|-id=781 bgcolor=#fefefe
| 54781 ||  || — || June 15, 2001 || Socorro || LINEAR || — || align=right | 2.3 km || 
|-id=782 bgcolor=#E9E9E9
| 54782 ||  || — || June 15, 2001 || Socorro || LINEAR || DOR || align=right | 7.3 km || 
|-id=783 bgcolor=#fefefe
| 54783 ||  || — || June 17, 2001 || Palomar || NEAT || NYS || align=right | 1.6 km || 
|-id=784 bgcolor=#fefefe
| 54784 ||  || — || June 16, 2001 || Socorro || LINEAR || — || align=right | 2.9 km || 
|-id=785 bgcolor=#fefefe
| 54785 ||  || — || June 16, 2001 || Socorro || LINEAR || V || align=right | 1.5 km || 
|-id=786 bgcolor=#fefefe
| 54786 ||  || — || June 16, 2001 || Haleakala || NEAT || — || align=right | 1.9 km || 
|-id=787 bgcolor=#fefefe
| 54787 ||  || — || June 16, 2001 || Palomar || NEAT || — || align=right | 2.5 km || 
|-id=788 bgcolor=#fefefe
| 54788 ||  || — || June 20, 2001 || Socorro || LINEAR || PHO || align=right | 2.5 km || 
|-id=789 bgcolor=#FFC2E0
| 54789 ||  || — || June 21, 2001 || Socorro || LINEAR || AMO +1km || align=right | 1.6 km || 
|-id=790 bgcolor=#E9E9E9
| 54790 ||  || — || June 16, 2001 || Haleakala || NEAT || EUN || align=right | 3.6 km || 
|-id=791 bgcolor=#E9E9E9
| 54791 ||  || — || June 21, 2001 || Palomar || NEAT || EUN || align=right | 3.6 km || 
|-id=792 bgcolor=#E9E9E9
| 54792 ||  || — || June 21, 2001 || Palomar || NEAT || — || align=right | 7.8 km || 
|-id=793 bgcolor=#E9E9E9
| 54793 ||  || — || June 24, 2001 || Desert Beaver || W. K. Y. Yeung || — || align=right | 3.1 km || 
|-id=794 bgcolor=#fefefe
| 54794 ||  || — || June 20, 2001 || Palomar || NEAT || — || align=right | 2.6 km || 
|-id=795 bgcolor=#E9E9E9
| 54795 ||  || — || June 21, 2001 || Palomar || NEAT || — || align=right | 2.4 km || 
|-id=796 bgcolor=#fefefe
| 54796 ||  || — || June 21, 2001 || Palomar || NEAT || — || align=right | 5.1 km || 
|-id=797 bgcolor=#E9E9E9
| 54797 ||  || — || June 22, 2001 || Palomar || NEAT || — || align=right | 3.9 km || 
|-id=798 bgcolor=#d6d6d6
| 54798 ||  || — || June 23, 2001 || Palomar || NEAT || — || align=right | 8.3 km || 
|-id=799 bgcolor=#E9E9E9
| 54799 ||  || — || June 28, 2001 || Anderson Mesa || LONEOS || CLO || align=right | 7.7 km || 
|-id=800 bgcolor=#E9E9E9
| 54800 ||  || — || June 28, 2001 || Anderson Mesa || LONEOS || — || align=right | 3.1 km || 
|}

54801–54900 

|-bgcolor=#fefefe
| 54801 ||  || — || June 24, 2001 || Farpoint || G. Hug || NYS || align=right | 1.7 km || 
|-id=802 bgcolor=#E9E9E9
| 54802 ||  || — || June 30, 2001 || Anderson Mesa || LONEOS || — || align=right | 7.8 km || 
|-id=803 bgcolor=#fefefe
| 54803 ||  || — || June 21, 2001 || Palomar || NEAT || — || align=right | 2.5 km || 
|-id=804 bgcolor=#fefefe
| 54804 ||  || — || June 28, 2001 || Palomar || NEAT || — || align=right | 2.2 km || 
|-id=805 bgcolor=#d6d6d6
| 54805 ||  || — || June 30, 2001 || Palomar || NEAT || — || align=right | 8.2 km || 
|-id=806 bgcolor=#d6d6d6
| 54806 ||  || — || June 30, 2001 || Palomar || NEAT || — || align=right | 9.4 km || 
|-id=807 bgcolor=#fefefe
| 54807 ||  || — || June 27, 2001 || Haleakala || NEAT || — || align=right | 6.1 km || 
|-id=808 bgcolor=#d6d6d6
| 54808 ||  || — || June 27, 2001 || Haleakala || NEAT || EUP || align=right | 23 km || 
|-id=809 bgcolor=#E9E9E9
| 54809 ||  || — || June 16, 2001 || Palomar || NEAT || — || align=right | 3.0 km || 
|-id=810 bgcolor=#fefefe
| 54810 Molleigh ||  ||  || June 16, 2001 || Anderson Mesa || LONEOS || — || align=right | 2.8 km || 
|-id=811 bgcolor=#fefefe
| 54811 ||  || — || June 19, 2001 || Haleakala || NEAT || V || align=right | 1.9 km || 
|-id=812 bgcolor=#E9E9E9
| 54812 ||  || — || June 19, 2001 || Haleakala || NEAT || — || align=right | 2.8 km || 
|-id=813 bgcolor=#fefefe
| 54813 ||  || — || June 21, 2001 || Palomar || NEAT || — || align=right | 1.3 km || 
|-id=814 bgcolor=#E9E9E9
| 54814 ||  || — || June 25, 2001 || Palomar || NEAT || — || align=right | 2.1 km || 
|-id=815 bgcolor=#E9E9E9
| 54815 ||  || — || June 27, 2001 || Anderson Mesa || LONEOS || — || align=right | 2.9 km || 
|-id=816 bgcolor=#d6d6d6
| 54816 ||  || — || June 29, 2001 || Kitt Peak || Spacewatch || — || align=right | 5.9 km || 
|-id=817 bgcolor=#E9E9E9
| 54817 || 2001 NB || — || July 2, 2001 || Palomar || NEAT || — || align=right | 9.7 km || 
|-id=818 bgcolor=#fefefe
| 54818 || 2001 NR || — || July 12, 2001 || Reedy Creek || J. Broughton || fast || align=right | 2.4 km || 
|-id=819 bgcolor=#fefefe
| 54819 ||  || — || July 12, 2001 || Palomar || NEAT || — || align=right | 3.0 km || 
|-id=820 bgcolor=#E9E9E9
| 54820 Svenders ||  ||  || July 11, 2001 || Needville || J. Dellinger, W. G. Dillon || — || align=right | 4.0 km || 
|-id=821 bgcolor=#fefefe
| 54821 ||  || — || July 13, 2001 || Reedy Creek || J. Broughton || — || align=right | 1.8 km || 
|-id=822 bgcolor=#d6d6d6
| 54822 ||  || — || July 13, 2001 || Palomar || NEAT || — || align=right | 8.3 km || 
|-id=823 bgcolor=#fefefe
| 54823 ||  || — || July 13, 2001 || Palomar || NEAT || NYS || align=right | 2.7 km || 
|-id=824 bgcolor=#fefefe
| 54824 ||  || — || July 13, 2001 || Palomar || NEAT || — || align=right | 1.8 km || 
|-id=825 bgcolor=#d6d6d6
| 54825 ||  || — || July 15, 2001 || Haleakala || NEAT || SYL7:4 || align=right | 9.1 km || 
|-id=826 bgcolor=#fefefe
| 54826 ||  || — || July 13, 2001 || Haleakala || NEAT || V || align=right | 2.0 km || 
|-id=827 bgcolor=#fefefe
| 54827 Kurpfalz ||  ||  || July 14, 2001 || Palomar || NEAT || NYS || align=right | 2.1 km || 
|-id=828 bgcolor=#E9E9E9
| 54828 ||  || — || July 13, 2001 || Palomar || NEAT || — || align=right | 2.7 km || 
|-id=829 bgcolor=#E9E9E9
| 54829 ||  || — || July 14, 2001 || Palomar || NEAT || EUN || align=right | 2.7 km || 
|-id=830 bgcolor=#E9E9E9
| 54830 ||  || — || July 14, 2001 || Haleakala || NEAT || — || align=right | 4.9 km || 
|-id=831 bgcolor=#fefefe
| 54831 ||  || — || July 14, 2001 || Haleakala || NEAT || V || align=right | 1.3 km || 
|-id=832 bgcolor=#E9E9E9
| 54832 ||  || — || July 13, 2001 || Haleakala || NEAT || — || align=right | 2.8 km || 
|-id=833 bgcolor=#E9E9E9
| 54833 ||  || — || July 14, 2001 || Palomar || NEAT || — || align=right | 2.4 km || 
|-id=834 bgcolor=#E9E9E9
| 54834 ||  || — || July 12, 2001 || Palomar || NEAT || — || align=right | 2.7 km || 
|-id=835 bgcolor=#E9E9E9
| 54835 ||  || — || July 12, 2001 || Haleakala || NEAT || MAR || align=right | 3.7 km || 
|-id=836 bgcolor=#fefefe
| 54836 ||  || — || July 12, 2001 || Socorro || LINEAR || NYS || align=right | 1.6 km || 
|-id=837 bgcolor=#d6d6d6
| 54837 ||  || — || July 13, 2001 || Palomar || NEAT || — || align=right | 8.9 km || 
|-id=838 bgcolor=#E9E9E9
| 54838 ||  || — || July 14, 2001 || Palomar || NEAT || — || align=right | 4.7 km || 
|-id=839 bgcolor=#E9E9E9
| 54839 ||  || — || July 14, 2001 || Palomar || NEAT || GEF || align=right | 5.1 km || 
|-id=840 bgcolor=#d6d6d6
| 54840 || 2001 OE || — || July 16, 2001 || Anderson Mesa || LONEOS || URS || align=right | 7.5 km || 
|-id=841 bgcolor=#fefefe
| 54841 ||  || — || July 18, 2001 || Palomar || NEAT || V || align=right | 1.4 km || 
|-id=842 bgcolor=#d6d6d6
| 54842 ||  || — || July 16, 2001 || Anderson Mesa || LONEOS || — || align=right | 9.7 km || 
|-id=843 bgcolor=#d6d6d6
| 54843 ||  || — || July 19, 2001 || Reedy Creek || J. Broughton || THM || align=right | 5.5 km || 
|-id=844 bgcolor=#d6d6d6
| 54844 ||  || — || July 19, 2001 || Reedy Creek || J. Broughton || EOS || align=right | 4.8 km || 
|-id=845 bgcolor=#fefefe
| 54845 ||  || — || July 19, 2001 || Desert Beaver || W. K. Y. Yeung || V || align=right | 2.8 km || 
|-id=846 bgcolor=#E9E9E9
| 54846 ||  || — || July 17, 2001 || Anderson Mesa || LONEOS || EUN || align=right | 4.2 km || 
|-id=847 bgcolor=#E9E9E9
| 54847 ||  || — || July 17, 2001 || Anderson Mesa || LONEOS || EUN || align=right | 5.2 km || 
|-id=848 bgcolor=#d6d6d6
| 54848 ||  || — || July 17, 2001 || Anderson Mesa || LONEOS || — || align=right | 7.2 km || 
|-id=849 bgcolor=#fefefe
| 54849 ||  || — || July 17, 2001 || Anderson Mesa || LONEOS || NYS || align=right | 6.0 km || 
|-id=850 bgcolor=#d6d6d6
| 54850 ||  || — || July 19, 2001 || Palomar || NEAT || — || align=right | 10 km || 
|-id=851 bgcolor=#d6d6d6
| 54851 ||  || — || July 18, 2001 || Palomar || NEAT || — || align=right | 4.1 km || 
|-id=852 bgcolor=#fefefe
| 54852 Mercatali ||  ||  || July 22, 2001 || San Marcello || L. Tesi, M. Tombelli || — || align=right | 1.3 km || 
|-id=853 bgcolor=#fefefe
| 54853 ||  || — || July 18, 2001 || Haleakala || NEAT || MAS || align=right | 2.7 km || 
|-id=854 bgcolor=#d6d6d6
| 54854 ||  || — || July 21, 2001 || Anderson Mesa || LONEOS || — || align=right | 14 km || 
|-id=855 bgcolor=#d6d6d6
| 54855 ||  || — || July 21, 2001 || Anderson Mesa || LONEOS || — || align=right | 9.6 km || 
|-id=856 bgcolor=#E9E9E9
| 54856 ||  || — || July 21, 2001 || Anderson Mesa || LONEOS || HOF || align=right | 9.6 km || 
|-id=857 bgcolor=#E9E9E9
| 54857 ||  || — || July 19, 2001 || Palomar || NEAT || — || align=right | 3.7 km || 
|-id=858 bgcolor=#E9E9E9
| 54858 ||  || — || July 16, 2001 || Anderson Mesa || LONEOS || — || align=right | 2.7 km || 
|-id=859 bgcolor=#fefefe
| 54859 ||  || — || July 16, 2001 || Anderson Mesa || LONEOS || — || align=right | 2.3 km || 
|-id=860 bgcolor=#fefefe
| 54860 ||  || — || July 16, 2001 || Haleakala || NEAT || — || align=right | 2.5 km || 
|-id=861 bgcolor=#E9E9E9
| 54861 ||  || — || July 18, 2001 || Haleakala || NEAT || — || align=right | 6.5 km || 
|-id=862 bgcolor=#fefefe
| 54862 Sundaigakuen ||  ||  || July 23, 2001 || Shishikui || H. Maeno || — || align=right | 2.8 km || 
|-id=863 bgcolor=#E9E9E9
| 54863 Gasnault ||  ||  || July 18, 2001 || Palomar || NEAT || — || align=right | 2.6 km || 
|-id=864 bgcolor=#d6d6d6
| 54864 ||  || — || July 18, 2001 || Palomar || NEAT || — || align=right | 4.2 km || 
|-id=865 bgcolor=#E9E9E9
| 54865 ||  || — || July 19, 2001 || Palomar || NEAT || GEF || align=right | 7.2 km || 
|-id=866 bgcolor=#d6d6d6
| 54866 ||  || — || July 20, 2001 || Palomar || NEAT || EOS || align=right | 5.4 km || 
|-id=867 bgcolor=#E9E9E9
| 54867 ||  || — || July 20, 2001 || Palomar || NEAT || — || align=right | 3.7 km || 
|-id=868 bgcolor=#fefefe
| 54868 ||  || — || July 20, 2001 || Palomar || NEAT || V || align=right | 1.6 km || 
|-id=869 bgcolor=#d6d6d6
| 54869 ||  || — || July 22, 2001 || Palomar || NEAT || VER || align=right | 8.7 km || 
|-id=870 bgcolor=#E9E9E9
| 54870 ||  || — || July 23, 2001 || Palomar || NEAT || — || align=right | 4.9 km || 
|-id=871 bgcolor=#d6d6d6
| 54871 ||  || — || July 23, 2001 || Palomar || NEAT || EOS || align=right | 6.5 km || 
|-id=872 bgcolor=#d6d6d6
| 54872 ||  || — || July 16, 2001 || Anderson Mesa || LONEOS || HYG || align=right | 5.8 km || 
|-id=873 bgcolor=#fefefe
| 54873 ||  || — || July 16, 2001 || Anderson Mesa || LONEOS || — || align=right | 2.0 km || 
|-id=874 bgcolor=#E9E9E9
| 54874 ||  || — || July 16, 2001 || Haleakala || NEAT || AGN || align=right | 3.1 km || 
|-id=875 bgcolor=#E9E9E9
| 54875 ||  || — || July 16, 2001 || Anderson Mesa || LONEOS || VIB || align=right | 7.8 km || 
|-id=876 bgcolor=#fefefe
| 54876 ||  || — || July 16, 2001 || Anderson Mesa || LONEOS || — || align=right | 2.9 km || 
|-id=877 bgcolor=#fefefe
| 54877 ||  || — || July 21, 2001 || Palomar || NEAT || V || align=right | 2.2 km || 
|-id=878 bgcolor=#E9E9E9
| 54878 ||  || — || July 21, 2001 || Palomar || NEAT || MAR || align=right | 3.7 km || 
|-id=879 bgcolor=#E9E9E9
| 54879 ||  || — || July 22, 2001 || Palomar || NEAT || — || align=right | 3.3 km || 
|-id=880 bgcolor=#fefefe
| 54880 ||  || — || July 22, 2001 || Palomar || NEAT || NYS || align=right | 3.6 km || 
|-id=881 bgcolor=#fefefe
| 54881 ||  || — || July 22, 2001 || Palomar || NEAT || H || align=right | 1.6 km || 
|-id=882 bgcolor=#d6d6d6
| 54882 ||  || — || July 16, 2001 || Anderson Mesa || LONEOS || TEL || align=right | 3.7 km || 
|-id=883 bgcolor=#d6d6d6
| 54883 ||  || — || July 19, 2001 || Palomar || NEAT || KOR || align=right | 5.1 km || 
|-id=884 bgcolor=#d6d6d6
| 54884 ||  || — || July 20, 2001 || Palomar || NEAT || — || align=right | 4.2 km || 
|-id=885 bgcolor=#fefefe
| 54885 ||  || — || July 21, 2001 || Haleakala || NEAT || V || align=right | 1.4 km || 
|-id=886 bgcolor=#fefefe
| 54886 ||  || — || July 21, 2001 || Haleakala || NEAT || — || align=right | 1.8 km || 
|-id=887 bgcolor=#d6d6d6
| 54887 ||  || — || July 26, 2001 || Desert Beaver || W. K. Y. Yeung || — || align=right | 8.7 km || 
|-id=888 bgcolor=#d6d6d6
| 54888 ||  || — || July 27, 2001 || Anderson Mesa || LONEOS || EOS || align=right | 4.3 km || 
|-id=889 bgcolor=#fefefe
| 54889 ||  || — || July 23, 2001 || Haleakala || NEAT || NYS || align=right | 1.6 km || 
|-id=890 bgcolor=#fefefe
| 54890 ||  || — || July 28, 2001 || Reedy Creek || J. Broughton || — || align=right | 2.1 km || 
|-id=891 bgcolor=#fefefe
| 54891 ||  || — || July 23, 2001 || Palomar || NEAT || — || align=right | 3.1 km || 
|-id=892 bgcolor=#E9E9E9
| 54892 ||  || — || July 16, 2001 || Haleakala || NEAT || EUN || align=right | 4.8 km || 
|-id=893 bgcolor=#d6d6d6
| 54893 ||  || — || July 19, 2001 || Anderson Mesa || LONEOS || — || align=right | 10 km || 
|-id=894 bgcolor=#E9E9E9
| 54894 ||  || — || July 19, 2001 || Anderson Mesa || LONEOS || — || align=right | 3.0 km || 
|-id=895 bgcolor=#E9E9E9
| 54895 ||  || — || July 19, 2001 || Anderson Mesa || LONEOS || — || align=right | 2.6 km || 
|-id=896 bgcolor=#E9E9E9
| 54896 ||  || — || July 19, 2001 || Anderson Mesa || LONEOS || HNS || align=right | 4.4 km || 
|-id=897 bgcolor=#d6d6d6
| 54897 ||  || — || July 21, 2001 || Anderson Mesa || LONEOS || KOR || align=right | 4.8 km || 
|-id=898 bgcolor=#fefefe
| 54898 ||  || — || July 21, 2001 || Anderson Mesa || LONEOS || — || align=right | 3.6 km || 
|-id=899 bgcolor=#E9E9E9
| 54899 ||  || — || July 21, 2001 || Anderson Mesa || LONEOS || — || align=right | 4.3 km || 
|-id=900 bgcolor=#d6d6d6
| 54900 ||  || — || July 19, 2001 || Palomar || NEAT || 615 || align=right | 5.7 km || 
|}

54901–55000 

|-bgcolor=#fefefe
| 54901 ||  || — || July 26, 2001 || Palomar || NEAT || — || align=right | 2.4 km || 
|-id=902 bgcolor=#fefefe
| 54902 Close ||  ||  || July 23, 2001 || Anza || M. Collins, M. White || NYS || align=right | 1.9 km || 
|-id=903 bgcolor=#fefefe
| 54903 ||  || — || July 26, 2001 || Palomar || NEAT || V || align=right | 1.4 km || 
|-id=904 bgcolor=#E9E9E9
| 54904 ||  || — || July 26, 2001 || Palomar || NEAT || WIT || align=right | 2.9 km || 
|-id=905 bgcolor=#E9E9E9
| 54905 ||  || — || July 29, 2001 || Palomar || NEAT || — || align=right | 4.4 km || 
|-id=906 bgcolor=#E9E9E9
| 54906 ||  || — || July 29, 2001 || Socorro || LINEAR || EUN || align=right | 6.2 km || 
|-id=907 bgcolor=#E9E9E9
| 54907 ||  || — || July 29, 2001 || Socorro || LINEAR || — || align=right | 6.2 km || 
|-id=908 bgcolor=#d6d6d6
| 54908 ||  || — || July 29, 2001 || Socorro || LINEAR || SAN || align=right | 9.0 km || 
|-id=909 bgcolor=#fefefe
| 54909 ||  || — || July 29, 2001 || Prescott || P. G. Comba || — || align=right | 4.3 km || 
|-id=910 bgcolor=#fefefe
| 54910 ||  || — || July 27, 2001 || Palomar || NEAT || — || align=right | 1.7 km || 
|-id=911 bgcolor=#d6d6d6
| 54911 ||  || — || July 27, 2001 || Palomar || NEAT || — || align=right | 11 km || 
|-id=912 bgcolor=#d6d6d6
| 54912 ||  || — || July 29, 2001 || Palomar || NEAT || — || align=right | 8.3 km || 
|-id=913 bgcolor=#E9E9E9
| 54913 ||  || — || July 31, 2001 || Palomar || NEAT || — || align=right | 4.2 km || 
|-id=914 bgcolor=#fefefe
| 54914 ||  || — || July 21, 2001 || Haleakala || NEAT || — || align=right | 3.6 km || 
|-id=915 bgcolor=#E9E9E9
| 54915 ||  || — || July 21, 2001 || Haleakala || NEAT || — || align=right | 5.5 km || 
|-id=916 bgcolor=#fefefe
| 54916 ||  || — || July 22, 2001 || Palomar || NEAT || — || align=right | 2.2 km || 
|-id=917 bgcolor=#E9E9E9
| 54917 ||  || — || July 22, 2001 || Palomar || NEAT || — || align=right | 6.4 km || 
|-id=918 bgcolor=#E9E9E9
| 54918 ||  || — || July 27, 2001 || Anderson Mesa || LONEOS || — || align=right | 2.2 km || 
|-id=919 bgcolor=#E9E9E9
| 54919 ||  || — || July 27, 2001 || Anderson Mesa || LONEOS || — || align=right | 5.0 km || 
|-id=920 bgcolor=#d6d6d6
| 54920 ||  || — || July 30, 2001 || Palomar || NEAT || THM || align=right | 6.2 km || 
|-id=921 bgcolor=#d6d6d6
| 54921 ||  || — || July 30, 2001 || Palomar || NEAT || — || align=right | 5.3 km || 
|-id=922 bgcolor=#fefefe
| 54922 ||  || — || July 31, 2001 || Palomar || NEAT || MAS || align=right | 1.9 km || 
|-id=923 bgcolor=#E9E9E9
| 54923 ||  || — || July 24, 2001 || Palomar || NEAT || MAR || align=right | 3.7 km || 
|-id=924 bgcolor=#E9E9E9
| 54924 ||  || — || July 25, 2001 || Haleakala || NEAT || — || align=right | 5.0 km || 
|-id=925 bgcolor=#fefefe
| 54925 ||  || — || July 26, 2001 || Palomar || NEAT || — || align=right | 2.6 km || 
|-id=926 bgcolor=#E9E9E9
| 54926 ||  || — || July 27, 2001 || Anderson Mesa || LONEOS || — || align=right | 2.2 km || 
|-id=927 bgcolor=#d6d6d6
| 54927 ||  || — || July 27, 2001 || Anderson Mesa || LONEOS || EOS || align=right | 6.6 km || 
|-id=928 bgcolor=#d6d6d6
| 54928 ||  || — || July 27, 2001 || Anderson Mesa || LONEOS || — || align=right | 5.7 km || 
|-id=929 bgcolor=#E9E9E9
| 54929 ||  || — || July 28, 2001 || Anderson Mesa || LONEOS || — || align=right | 4.3 km || 
|-id=930 bgcolor=#d6d6d6
| 54930 ||  || — || July 28, 2001 || Haleakala || NEAT || — || align=right | 4.4 km || 
|-id=931 bgcolor=#E9E9E9
| 54931 ||  || — || July 29, 2001 || Anderson Mesa || LONEOS || — || align=right | 6.2 km || 
|-id=932 bgcolor=#d6d6d6
| 54932 Waltharris ||  ||  || July 27, 2001 || Anderson Mesa || LONEOS || THM || align=right | 8.0 km || 
|-id=933 bgcolor=#E9E9E9
| 54933 ||  || — || July 29, 2001 || Anderson Mesa || LONEOS || — || align=right | 3.8 km || 
|-id=934 bgcolor=#E9E9E9
| 54934 ||  || — || July 29, 2001 || Anderson Mesa || LONEOS || — || align=right | 5.3 km || 
|-id=935 bgcolor=#fefefe
| 54935 ||  || — || July 29, 2001 || Socorro || LINEAR || — || align=right | 4.6 km || 
|-id=936 bgcolor=#fefefe
| 54936 ||  || — || July 29, 2001 || Anderson Mesa || LONEOS || — || align=right | 5.2 km || 
|-id=937 bgcolor=#E9E9E9
| 54937 ||  || — || July 29, 2001 || Socorro || LINEAR || EUN || align=right | 4.5 km || 
|-id=938 bgcolor=#fefefe
| 54938 ||  || — || July 29, 2001 || Socorro || LINEAR || V || align=right | 2.0 km || 
|-id=939 bgcolor=#E9E9E9
| 54939 ||  || — || July 29, 2001 || Anderson Mesa || LONEOS || — || align=right | 3.3 km || 
|-id=940 bgcolor=#E9E9E9
| 54940 ||  || — || July 30, 2001 || Socorro || LINEAR || — || align=right | 3.0 km || 
|-id=941 bgcolor=#E9E9E9
| 54941 ||  || — || July 31, 2001 || Socorro || LINEAR || ADE || align=right | 13 km || 
|-id=942 bgcolor=#E9E9E9
| 54942 ||  || — || July 19, 2001 || Palomar || NEAT || — || align=right | 4.3 km || 
|-id=943 bgcolor=#E9E9E9
| 54943 ||  || — || August 7, 2001 || Palomar || NEAT || — || align=right | 5.2 km || 
|-id=944 bgcolor=#fefefe
| 54944 ||  || — || August 8, 2001 || Haleakala || NEAT || — || align=right | 1.5 km || 
|-id=945 bgcolor=#E9E9E9
| 54945 ||  || — || August 3, 2001 || Haleakala || NEAT || MAR || align=right | 3.6 km || 
|-id=946 bgcolor=#fefefe
| 54946 ||  || — || August 3, 2001 || Haleakala || NEAT || V || align=right | 1.6 km || 
|-id=947 bgcolor=#d6d6d6
| 54947 ||  || — || August 5, 2001 || Palomar || NEAT || — || align=right | 5.2 km || 
|-id=948 bgcolor=#fefefe
| 54948 ||  || — || August 8, 2001 || Haleakala || NEAT || — || align=right | 1.6 km || 
|-id=949 bgcolor=#E9E9E9
| 54949 ||  || — || August 9, 2001 || Palomar || NEAT || — || align=right | 7.1 km || 
|-id=950 bgcolor=#E9E9E9
| 54950 ||  || — || August 9, 2001 || Palomar || NEAT || — || align=right | 2.2 km || 
|-id=951 bgcolor=#d6d6d6
| 54951 ||  || — || August 10, 2001 || Haleakala || NEAT || THM || align=right | 6.5 km || 
|-id=952 bgcolor=#E9E9E9
| 54952 ||  || — || August 10, 2001 || Haleakala || NEAT || — || align=right | 3.1 km || 
|-id=953 bgcolor=#E9E9E9
| 54953 ||  || — || August 10, 2001 || Haleakala || NEAT || — || align=right | 6.6 km || 
|-id=954 bgcolor=#fefefe
| 54954 ||  || — || August 10, 2001 || Haleakala || NEAT || V || align=right | 1.8 km || 
|-id=955 bgcolor=#E9E9E9
| 54955 ||  || — || August 5, 2001 || Palomar || NEAT || — || align=right | 5.2 km || 
|-id=956 bgcolor=#d6d6d6
| 54956 ||  || — || August 8, 2001 || Palomar || NEAT || ALA || align=right | 11 km || 
|-id=957 bgcolor=#fefefe
| 54957 ||  || — || August 10, 2001 || Palomar || NEAT || — || align=right | 1.7 km || 
|-id=958 bgcolor=#fefefe
| 54958 ||  || — || August 11, 2001 || Palomar || NEAT || — || align=right | 3.3 km || 
|-id=959 bgcolor=#d6d6d6
| 54959 ||  || — || August 11, 2001 || Haleakala || NEAT || — || align=right | 5.7 km || 
|-id=960 bgcolor=#fefefe
| 54960 ||  || — || August 8, 2001 || Haleakala || NEAT || — || align=right | 4.6 km || 
|-id=961 bgcolor=#E9E9E9
| 54961 ||  || — || August 8, 2001 || Haleakala || NEAT || — || align=right | 3.2 km || 
|-id=962 bgcolor=#E9E9E9
| 54962 ||  || — || August 12, 2001 || Palomar || NEAT || — || align=right | 3.2 km || 
|-id=963 bgcolor=#E9E9E9
| 54963 Sotin ||  ||  || August 12, 2001 || Palomar || NEAT || — || align=right | 4.0 km || 
|-id=964 bgcolor=#fefefe
| 54964 ||  || — || August 11, 2001 || Haleakala || NEAT || V || align=right | 1.6 km || 
|-id=965 bgcolor=#fefefe
| 54965 ||  || — || August 11, 2001 || Haleakala || NEAT || — || align=right | 2.2 km || 
|-id=966 bgcolor=#d6d6d6
| 54966 ||  || — || August 13, 2001 || Haleakala || NEAT || — || align=right | 5.3 km || 
|-id=967 bgcolor=#E9E9E9
| 54967 Millucci ||  ||  || August 15, 2001 || San Marcello || A. Boattini, L. Tesi || NEM || align=right | 5.6 km || 
|-id=968 bgcolor=#E9E9E9
| 54968 ||  || — || August 10, 2001 || Palomar || NEAT || MAR || align=right | 2.7 km || 
|-id=969 bgcolor=#d6d6d6
| 54969 ||  || — || August 10, 2001 || Palomar || NEAT || URS || align=right | 8.4 km || 
|-id=970 bgcolor=#E9E9E9
| 54970 ||  || — || August 11, 2001 || Palomar || NEAT || GER || align=right | 3.2 km || 
|-id=971 bgcolor=#d6d6d6
| 54971 ||  || — || August 12, 2001 || Palomar || NEAT || EOS || align=right | 6.1 km || 
|-id=972 bgcolor=#d6d6d6
| 54972 ||  || — || August 12, 2001 || Palomar || NEAT || — || align=right | 6.4 km || 
|-id=973 bgcolor=#d6d6d6
| 54973 ||  || — || August 15, 2001 || Haleakala || NEAT || KOR || align=right | 3.1 km || 
|-id=974 bgcolor=#d6d6d6
| 54974 ||  || — || August 11, 2001 || Haleakala || NEAT || — || align=right | 5.1 km || 
|-id=975 bgcolor=#d6d6d6
| 54975 ||  || — || August 13, 2001 || Haleakala || NEAT || — || align=right | 8.1 km || 
|-id=976 bgcolor=#E9E9E9
| 54976 ||  || — || August 13, 2001 || Palomar || NEAT || — || align=right | 3.3 km || 
|-id=977 bgcolor=#E9E9E9
| 54977 ||  || — || August 14, 2001 || Palomar || NEAT || — || align=right | 7.1 km || 
|-id=978 bgcolor=#E9E9E9
| 54978 ||  || — || August 15, 2001 || Haleakala || NEAT || — || align=right | 3.7 km || 
|-id=979 bgcolor=#fefefe
| 54979 ||  || — || August 14, 2001 || Haleakala || NEAT || NYS || align=right | 4.1 km || 
|-id=980 bgcolor=#fefefe
| 54980 ||  || — || August 13, 2001 || Haleakala || NEAT || — || align=right | 1.5 km || 
|-id=981 bgcolor=#E9E9E9
| 54981 ||  || — || August 13, 2001 || Haleakala || NEAT || — || align=right | 2.3 km || 
|-id=982 bgcolor=#E9E9E9
| 54982 ||  || — || August 13, 2001 || Haleakala || NEAT || WIT || align=right | 2.3 km || 
|-id=983 bgcolor=#E9E9E9
| 54983 || 2001 QE || — || August 16, 2001 || San Marcello || M. Tombelli, A. Boattini || — || align=right | 2.2 km || 
|-id=984 bgcolor=#d6d6d6
| 54984 || 2001 QR || — || August 16, 2001 || Socorro || LINEAR || — || align=right | 5.0 km || 
|-id=985 bgcolor=#E9E9E9
| 54985 ||  || — || August 16, 2001 || Socorro || LINEAR || — || align=right | 2.3 km || 
|-id=986 bgcolor=#E9E9E9
| 54986 ||  || — || August 16, 2001 || Socorro || LINEAR || — || align=right | 3.3 km || 
|-id=987 bgcolor=#E9E9E9
| 54987 ||  || — || August 16, 2001 || Socorro || LINEAR || GEF || align=right | 2.6 km || 
|-id=988 bgcolor=#fefefe
| 54988 ||  || — || August 16, 2001 || Socorro || LINEAR || — || align=right | 2.1 km || 
|-id=989 bgcolor=#fefefe
| 54989 ||  || — || August 16, 2001 || Socorro || LINEAR || — || align=right | 1.8 km || 
|-id=990 bgcolor=#d6d6d6
| 54990 ||  || — || August 16, 2001 || Socorro || LINEAR || — || align=right | 5.6 km || 
|-id=991 bgcolor=#E9E9E9
| 54991 ||  || — || August 16, 2001 || Socorro || LINEAR || — || align=right | 6.0 km || 
|-id=992 bgcolor=#E9E9E9
| 54992 ||  || — || August 16, 2001 || Socorro || LINEAR || PAD || align=right | 5.1 km || 
|-id=993 bgcolor=#fefefe
| 54993 ||  || — || August 16, 2001 || Socorro || LINEAR || — || align=right | 2.4 km || 
|-id=994 bgcolor=#fefefe
| 54994 ||  || — || August 16, 2001 || Socorro || LINEAR || — || align=right | 2.1 km || 
|-id=995 bgcolor=#d6d6d6
| 54995 ||  || — || August 16, 2001 || Socorro || LINEAR || — || align=right | 7.4 km || 
|-id=996 bgcolor=#fefefe
| 54996 ||  || — || August 16, 2001 || Socorro || LINEAR || — || align=right | 2.1 km || 
|-id=997 bgcolor=#E9E9E9
| 54997 ||  || — || August 16, 2001 || Socorro || LINEAR || ADE || align=right | 8.8 km || 
|-id=998 bgcolor=#E9E9E9
| 54998 ||  || — || August 16, 2001 || Socorro || LINEAR || — || align=right | 4.3 km || 
|-id=999 bgcolor=#E9E9E9
| 54999 ||  || — || August 16, 2001 || Socorro || LINEAR || — || align=right | 3.9 km || 
|-id=000 bgcolor=#E9E9E9
| 55000 ||  || — || August 16, 2001 || Socorro || LINEAR || — || align=right | 2.1 km || 
|}

References

External links 
 Discovery Circumstances: Numbered Minor Planets (50001)–(55000) (IAU Minor Planet Center)

0054